= Amur campaign =

- Part of the Ming-Qing transition
Date	1639–1643
Location	Northeast Asia
Result	Qing dynasty victory

Belligerents
Evenks; Daurs	Qing dynasty

Commanders and leaders
Bombogor; Bardači	Simshika

Strength
500	

The Amur campaign was a war waged by the Qing dynasty against peoples living along the Amur River region from 1639 to 1643. It ended in the subjugation and integration of the natives into the Eight Banners.

== Background ==
The recently created Qing dynasty under Hong Taiji expanded rapidly during the 1630s in all directions. One of the areas which came under attack by Qing expansionism was the northeast Amur river region where people such as the Evenks, Nanai, Daur, and Solon lived.

== Campaign ==
In 1639, Qing forces attacked the Solon and Daur people. A force of 500 under the Evenk chieftain Bombogor tried to resist, but the Qing defeated them and captured the fortresses of Duochen, Asajin, Yakesa, and Duojin in the following year.

In 1643 the Amur region natives submitted to the Qing.

== Aftermath ==
Those who surrendered were incorporated into the Eight Banners. Although victorious, the Qing later attacked and resettled the Daurs in 1654 and 1656 to prevent them from coming under the control of the Russians.

== Bibliography ==
- Narangoa, Li (2014), Historical Atlas of Northeast Asia, 1590-2010: Korea, Manchuria, Mongolia, Eastern Siberia, New York: Columbia University Press, ISBN 9780231160704
- Swope, Kenneth (2014), The Military Collapse of China's Ming Dynasty, Routledge
- Wakeman, Frederic (1985), The Great Enterprise: The Manchu Reconstruction of Imperial Order in Seventeenth-Century China, vol. 1, University of California Press
