= Kudrin =

Kudrin (Russian: Кудрин) is a Russian masculine surname, its feminine counterpart is Kudrina. Notable people with the surname include:

- Alexei Kudrin (born 1960), Russian politician
- Olga Kudrina (c. 1890–1944), shamaness of Inner Mongolia
- Pavel Kudrin (born 1983), Russian football player
- Sergey Kudrin (born 1959), American chess grandmaster
