= Chiyo Nakamura =

Japanese shaman, craftswoman, performer, and writer

Chiyo Nakamura Japanese: 中村チヨ
- Chiyo Nakamura in the 1950s
- Born: Cho (Japanese: チョ); 1906; Shisuka, Karafuto, Japan
- Died: 1969 (aged 62–63); Abashiri, Hokkaido, Japan
- Other names: Chiyoko Nakamura (Japanese: 中村千代子)
- Occupations: Shaman, craftswoman, writer
- Years active: 1947–1969
- Era: Shōwa era

Chiyo Nakamura (Japanese: 中村チヨ, romanized: Nakamura Chiyo; 1906–1969) was a Japanese Nivkh shaman, craftswoman, performer, and writer of Nivkh folklore and songs.

She lived on Sakhalin before evacuating to Hokkaido at the end of World War II. After she resettled, she led performances and contributed to the practice and preservation of Nivkh culture. Since her death, her recorded oral works have been published as Gilyak Folklore, and her cultural artifacts have been displayed at several Japanese museums.

== Early life ==
In September 1905, the year before Chiyo was born, Sakhalin island below the 50° north parallel became Japanese territory under the Treaty of Portsmouth.

In 1906, Chiyo was born in Shisuka, Karafuto Prefecture, Japan. (Note: Since 1945: Poronaysk, Sakhalin Oblast, Russia.) Her father was a Santan person (Japanese: 山丹), (Note: "Santan" refers to any aboriginal of the diverse lower Amur River basin engaged in trade in Karafuto. Amur basin indigenous groups included Tungusic peoples (Evenks, Duchers, Jurchen, Nanai, Ulch), Mongols (Daur people), some Ainu and, near its mouth, Nivkh people.) born on Sakhalin and raised on the Asian mainland, who came to Shisuka in his 20s and married a Nivkh woman. Chiyo was named "Cho" (Japanese: チョ) when she was born; she was a member of the Nivkh Kenvng clan (Japanese: ケヌブン, romanized: Kenubun). Chiyo also used the normative kanji spelling in Japanese: 千代 for her personal name, as well as the longer "Chiyoko" (Japanese: 千代子).

When Chiyo was born in 1906, the southern Poronay basin including Shisuka was a Nivkh enclave among settlements of Sakhalin Ainu and Oroks.

== Evacuation to Hokkaido ==
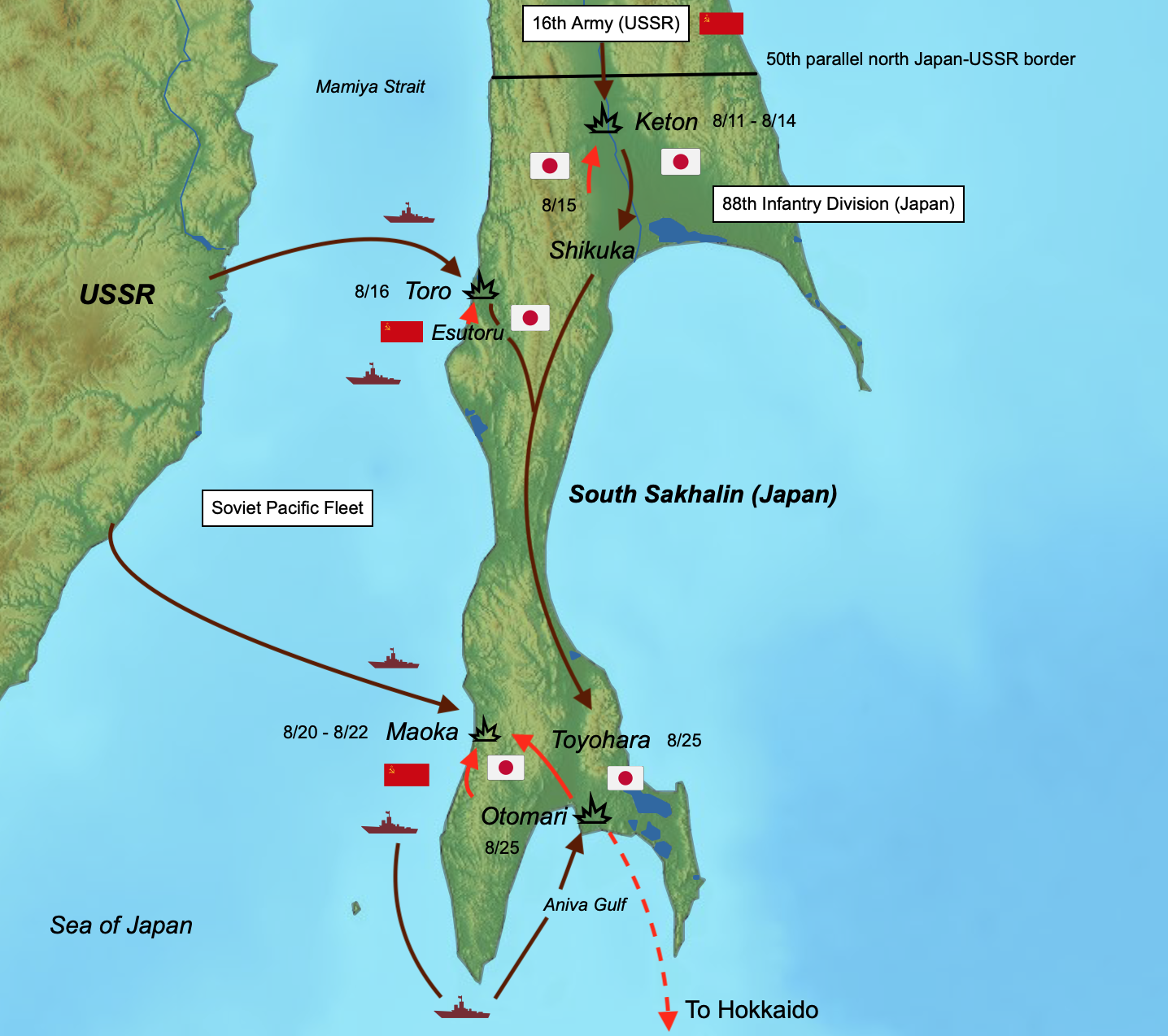
The Soviet invasion of Karafuto (August 1945)

In August 1945, when Chiyo was about 39 years old, the Soviet Union invaded Karafuto and quickly conquered it. Between 1946 and 1948, Japanese inhabitants of Sakhalin (including Japanized indigenous people) who had not already been evacuated during World War II were deported to Japan under an agreement between the Soviet Union and the United States.

In 1947, Chiyo and her family, including two of her children, relocated from Otasu in Sakhalin to Hokkaido. First, they lived in Iwanai for about two years; then they moved to Abashiri, where several other Nivkh and Orok families also settled. (Note: By 2004, the Nivkh-Orok community in Abashiri had vanished.) Chiyo also had a third child; she hoped to be reunited with her eldest son Igrain (イガライヌ; Japanese: 一郎, romanized: Ichirō) in Hokkaido, but he was exiled to Siberia and died in a Soviet camp.

In 1969, Chiyo died in Abashiri.

== Cultural works ==
In Abashiri, Chiyo led an amateur performance ensemble. Preserved at the Hokkaido Museum of Northern Peoples are photos of Chiyo's performances, along with her three wooden idols, shaman's belt, rattle, and tambourine beater. Her other artifacts, including handmade traditional fur clothing, have been displayed at the Hokkaido University Botanical Gardens Museum and at the Hokkaido Island Historical Museum. Chiyo also collaborated on linguistic research with Yonemura Kioe, director of the Abashiri City Local Museum.

Chiyo's main written work is Gilyak Folklore (Japanese: ギリヤークの昔話) (1992), posthumously published, which she dictated to Robert Austerlitz between 1956 and 1958. Her other dictations published in 1992 include "The Cowardly Santan," "Old Ainu Stories," two stories about an Ainu fox, "The Alcohol-Loving Ainu God," two stories about the Orok, and two stories about war between the Ainu and Orok.

== See also ==
- Nivkh people
- Olga Kudrina
- Shamanism in Siberia
