= Galina Varlamova =

Evenk writer, philologist, and folklorist (1951–2019)

Galina Ivanovna Varlamova or Keptuke (native name) (18 January 1951 – 19 June 2019) (Russian: Галина Ивановна Варламова, Кэптукэ) was an Evenk writer, philologist and folklorist. She was an expert in Evenk language and folklore. She wrote in Russian, Evenk and Yakut languages.

== Bibliography ==
- Эпические традиции в эвенкийском фольклоре. Якутск, Изд-во "Северовед", 1996. The book was heavily criticized.
- Имеющая свое имя Джелтула-река. Повесть. - Якутск, 1989;
- Рассказы Чэриктэ. На эвенкийском и русском языках. - Красноярск, 1990;
- Маленькая Америка. Повесть, рассказы. - М., 1991;
- Двуногий да поперечноглазый, черноголовый человек - эвенк и его земля Дулин Буга. - Якутск, 1991
- "Фразеологизмы в эвенкийском языке", Новосибирск: Наука. Сиб. отд-ние, 1986. – 80 с. ( Ph.D. thesis)
- "Эвенкийские сказания и сказки"
