= Bombogor (chief) =

Dular Bombogor (simplified Chinese: 杜拉尔·博木博果尔; traditional Chinese: 杜拉爾·博木博果爾; pinyin: Dùlā’ěr Bómùbóguǒ’ěr) (probably born in Yaksa – 1640, in Mukden) was an Evenk chief, leader of the Evenk federation. His power base laid on the basin of the Amur river.

In 1638, the Qing Emperor Hong Taiji sent general Samshika against Bombogor but his campaign failed to subdue Evenk resistance.

In December 1639, Hong Taiji sent another large force to the Amur. This force penetrated deep into Solon territory, reaching the Kumara River. The Battle of Gualar was fought between 2 Manchu regiments and a detachment of 500 Solons and Daurs led by Bombogor.

In May 1640, the Manchus assaulted the Evenk fortresses of Duochen, Asajin, Yakesa, and Duojin; capturing all four of them and large numbers of horses, cattle, pelts, and slaves.

Although Bombogor continued his resistance he was losing support; the Evenks were no match for the powerful Manchu armies and many Solons switched their allegiance to the Manchu Khan.

In August 1640 Hong Taiji sent general Xiteku against Bombogor. The latter fled to Mongolia, but Xiteku caught up with him in the vicinity of Qiluotai, capturing his baggage train, wives and children. Bombogor was captured and taken to Mukden where he was executed. With Bombogor's death Evenk resistance collapsed and the Manchu secured control of the Amur peoples. The Evenks and other local peoples were absorbed into the Eight Banners.

== See also ==
- Evenks
- History of Manchuria

== Sources ==
- USSR Academy of Sciences (1983). Manzhou Rule in China. Progress Publishers.
- Kyle Crossley, Pamela (2002). A Translucent Mirror: History and Identity in Qing Imperial Ideology. University of California Press. ISBN 978-0-520-23424-6.
- Peterson, Willard J. (2002). The Cambridge History of China. Vol. 9. Cambridge University Press. ISBN 978-0-521-24334-6.
