= Robert Austerlitz =

Romanian-American linguist (1923–1994)

- Born: Robert Paul Austerlitz; December 13, 1923; Bucharest, Romania
- Died: September 9, 1994 (aged 70)
- Education: Columbia University
- Occupation: linguist

Robert Paul Austerlitz (December 13, 1923 – September 9, 1994) was a Romanian-American linguist. Born in Bucharest, he emigrated to the United States in 1938. He received a bachelor of arts from the New School for Social Research. In June 1950, he received a Master of Arts from Columbia University, where he studied under André Martinet. With funding from the Ford Foundation, he studied the Uralic and Altaic languages at the University of Helsinki from 1951 to 1953 and Nivkh and Hokkaido at the University of Tokyo from 1953 to 1954.

== Life ==
He earned his doctorate from the Department of Uralic and Altaic languages at Columbia University in December 1955. Afterwards, he returned to Japan to study the languages Nivkh, Orok, and Ainu, this time with funding from both the Ford Foundation and the American Philosophical Society. He also conducted research in Finland, funded by the New York Botanical Garden.

He became Assistant Professor of Linguistic and Uralic Studies at Columbia University in 1958 and Associate Professor from 1962 to 1965. Between 1960 and 1965, together with Uriel Weinreich, William Diver, and André Martinet, he was co-editor of the journal Word. In 1965, he became Professor of Linguistic and Uralic Studies at Columbia, where he served as President of the Department of Linguistics for the following three years.

In 1961, with funding from a National Science Foundation grant to Michael Krauss, Austerlitz conducted approximately one month of field work with the Eyak language, resulting in a collection of at least eight recordings and approximately 600 pages of manuscript notes, now housed at the Alaska Native Language Archive.

In 1965, with funding from Indiana University, he researched the Hungarian language by invitation of the Institute for Cultural Relations, located in Budapest, Hungary. He was a visiting professor at eight universities, including Yale, Helsinki, and the University of California at Berkeley.

He was Councilor of the Interlingua Institute, which funded and promoted Interlingua, from 1975 until his death in 1994. In 1990, he became President of the Linguistic Society of America. In the summer of 1994, shortly before his death, he received an honorary doctorate from the University of Helsinki. He was elected a Fellow of the American Academy of Arts and Sciences in 1991.

== Publications ==
His publications include the books Ob-Ugric metrics: The metrical structure of Ostyak and Vogul folk-poetry (1958) and Finnish reader and glossary (1963). He was co-editor of Readings in linguistics II (1966) with Eric P. Hamp and Fred W. Householder. This volume followed Readings in linguistics (1958), edited by Martin Joos. In 1992, Austerlitz published dictations from recordings of Nivkh shaman Chiyo Nakamura (1903–1969), done during his stay in Japan in the 1950s.
