= Ureltu =

Evenki Chinese writer

Ureltu (Chinese: 乌热尔图) is a modern Evenki Chinese writer.

Ureltu's original name is Tu Shaomin (涂绍民). He was born in Ulan Hot, Inner Mongolia on April 20, 1952. His father was Evenk, and his mother was Daur. Most time of his childhood was spent at Nirki, Morin Dawa Daur Autonomous Banner. Ureltu received Han Chinese and Daur culture education at infants' school, elementary school and junior high school. During the Cultural Revolution, he exiled to Aoluguya Evenke National Village, Ergun Left Banner. He lived nearly 10 years at Aoluguya, successively worked as a hanter, worker and policeman, and later joined the Chinese Communist Party. He has served as the publicity committeeman and deputy secretary of the village party committee after that. In 1976 he published his maiden work Little Kevass of the Great Mountain, a story for children, when he used the pen name Ureltu ("son of the forest" in Evenk language) for the first time.

In 1980, Ureltu was transferred to work at Federation of Literary in Hulunbuir League, later successively attended the National Conference on Literature of Minority Groups and the Third Literature Congress of Inner Mongolia. In the next year, he was sent to study at the literature workshop of China Writers Association. In this year he received several awards, for example, Look, That Greenery won him the National Prize for Literature of Minority Groups, Obsecration of a Hunter won him the National Excellent Short Story Award, Dream Forest won him Gold Award for Inner Mongolian Literature, and Hounds won him Grassland Award for Excellent Short Stories. During the next two years he wrote a series of short stories continued, among which the Hart with Seven-Fork Horns and Amber Bonfire won him the National Excellent Short Story Award of 1982 and 1983. In 1985 he became a secretary of the China Writers Association Secretariat. In 1988 he wrote three short stories, Wolker and Bilig, Firing Early in the Morning and Malu, Malu. In the early 1990s, Ureltu published novella Mysterious Forest, then stopped his fiction writing.
