= Maria Fedotova-Nulgynet =

Russian poet, children's writer, and storyteller

Maria Prokopyevna Fedotova-Nulgynet (Russian: Мария Прокопьевна Федотова-Нулгынэт) (born 31 December 1946) is an Evenk poet, children's writer, and storyteller.

== Biography ==
Born in the Ust-Yansky District, Fedotova-Nulgynet began writing during her childhood, publishing her poetry in a variety of local and regional newspapers. She studied locally before traveling to the village of Khonuu to further her education. She graduated from high school in 1971, and in 1988 finished her degree in absentia from Yakutsk State University. For many years she worked as a teacher in Momsky District; it was during this time that she conducted a literary circle for students, which led to the publication of her first book in 1994. She writes in Evenk, Yakut, and Russian, and has won a variety of awards for her books. Her work deals with the inner lives of children, and has been translated.
