= Nikita Sakharov =

Soviet poet and writer

Nikita Vasilyevich Sakharov (Russian: Ники́та Васи́льевич Са́харов; 1915 in Gulya, Transbaikal Oblast – 1945) was a Soviet Evenk poet and prose writer.

== Biography ==
Nikita Sakharov was born in Siberia in 1915. He began his education at a rural Siberian school, moved to the city of Chita to continue his studies, and came to Leningrad in the early 1930s to attend the Institute of the Peoples of the North. He began writing as a student. His best-known work, the 1938 novel Red Suglan, described the initiation of collective farming in the rural north.

Nikita Sakharov volunteered for the Red Army after the German invasion of the Soviet Union in 1941. A decorated serviceman, he died fighting in Germany in April 1945.

Sakharov's literary works were republished or published in Russian-language translation for the first time after the war, and much of his reputation as a writer is based on the literary research carried out in the post-war period. The Soviet Evenk historian Vasily Uchanov described Red Suglan as "the most conspicuous Evenk literary work of the 1930s." A phonogram recording of his voice is preserved by the Phonogram Archives of the Institute of Russian Literature.

== Honours and awards ==
- Order of the Patriotic War, 1st class
- Order of the Red Star
