= D. O. Chaoke =

Linguist of Tungusic languages

Dular Osor Chaoke (Chinese: 杜拉尔·敖斯尔·朝克; pinyin: Dùlā'ěr Áosī'ěr Zhāokè; born 1958), also known as Dular Osor Chog, is a Chinese linguist at the Chinese Academy of Social Sciences. His primary area of study is on the Tungusic languages, especially his native Evenki language.

== Personal life and education ==
Chaoke was born in Nantun (南屯), Evenk Autonomous Banner in northeastern Inner Mongolia. "Osor" is the personal name of his father, while "Dular" is that of his ancestors, i.e. surname. He grew up speaking Evenki at home and attending a Mongolian-medium school, but says he did not become fully fluent in Mandarin Chinese until he graduated from high school.

After his high school graduation, Chaoke spent some years as a herder; he then became part of the "Class of 1978" (those who took the first offering of the National Higher Education Entrance Examination after it was reinstated that year) and with his results attained admission to the Central University for Nationalities (Minzu University of China) Department of Linguistics. He wrote his senior thesis on the structure of the Evenki language.

Chaoke is married to Wang Lizhen (汪丽珍), who is of Manchu ethnicity. The rest of his family are also highly educated, with four doctorates among them; his younger sister Kalina did her Ph.D. in anthropology at the Central University for Nationalities, while his younger brother Chogja did his at Chiba University in Chiba, Japan.

== Career ==
Following his graduation, Chaoke took up a position as a researcher at his alma mater in 1982. In 1988, he received a Japanese government scholarship, and departed his home country for Japan to enroll in a doctoral program at the Tokyo University of Foreign Studies. He quickly completed his coursework there and began work on his thesis, and also began extending his impressive publication record to Japanese, with ten papers and two books. In total from 1982 to 2006 he published 120 papers and eighteen books, a total output estimated at six million characters.

Outside of academia, Chaoke has served as a representative to the ninth, tenth, and eleventh National People's Congresses. He saved a portion of the money from his Japanese government scholarship, and upon his return to China used it to establish an "Evenk Ethnic Culture Village" in the Evenk Autonomous Banner.

== Selected works ==
- Chaoke, D. O. (2009), 《鄂温克语参考语法》 [Evenki Grammar Reference], Beijing: 中国社会科学出版社 [China Social Sciences Publishing House], ISBN 978-7-5004-8143-0
