= Olga Kudrina =

Olga Dmitrievna Kudrina (c. 1890-1944) was a shamaness among the Reindeer Evenki of northern Inner Mongolia along the Amur River's Great Bend (today under the jurisdiction of Genhe, Hulunbuir). She was accepted as an arbiter between the various Reindeer Evenki groups, helping to defuse conflicts between families when a member of one murdered a member of the other; after her death, the egalitarian hunters were left with no widely accepted shaman or other authority figure, and conflicts among them escalated into a chain of serious cases of blood revenge.

== Background and early life ==
The Reindeer Evenki comprise three groups: the Mohe, Cigančen, and Three-River (Gunačen). Originally, Filipp Vasil’evič Sologon was the shaman of the Mohe group, while Kudrina belonged to the Gunačen in the south. She came from a family of shamans; her grandmother, uncle Vasilij Jakovlevič Kudrin, and cousin Innokentij Ivanovič Kudrin were all shamans. It was common for many shamans to come from the same family; however, the position was not necessarily transmitted lineally.

Kudrina's responsibilities as a shamaness included aiding in the hunt, curing the sick, and watching over the souls of the deceased; she was required to be knowledgeable about spirits and religion. She started on the path to becoming a shamaness in 1923, in a dream in which she claimed to have seen the spirit of her predecessor and received his knowledge. During this time she was reported to have gone deep into the forest, remaining there for two weeks without fire or food.

== Death and legacy ==
Sologon died in 1942, leading Kudrina to take over responsibility for his group. This meant that she had to make arduous treks over the Greater Khingan mountains to reach the hunting grounds of the Mohe group. Conflicts broke out more frequently in these years due to the Japanese occupation, pitting pro-Japanese Evenki against anti-Japanese Evenki; in 1944, about fifty people from the Mohe group fled back to Russia as a result. Kudrina died later that same year, leaving behind two other shamans: her cousin Kudrin, and Njura Kaltakun, neither of whom had widely accepted authority among all the groups. Blood revenge spread after her death, but older hunters made efforts to halt the cycle, seeing the threat it posed to their survival as an ethnic group, and Kaltakun would finally be able to bring the blood feuds to a halt in the early 1950s.

Kudrina had no children of her own. She was survived by her adopted son, Victor Kudrin. She also took Anatolij Makarovič Kajgorodov (1927–1998), a member of a Russian Cossack family with whom the Reindeer Evenki frequently traded, as a godson; he would go on to become a well-known ethnographer of the Tungusic peoples.

== See also ==
- Chiyo Nakamura
- Shamanism in Siberia

== Sources ==
- Heyne, F. Georg (1999), "The Social Significance of the Shaman among the Chinese Reindeer-Evenki" (PDF), Asian Folklore Studies, 58 (2): 377–395, doi:10.2307/1179101, JSTOR 1179101, archived from the original (PDF) on 2012-03-20
- Heyne, F. Georg (2007), "Notes on Blood Revenge among the Reindeer Evenki of Manchuria" (PDF), Asian Folklore Studies, 66 (1/2): 165–178, archived from the original (PDF) on 2012-03-20
