= Solon people =

Subgroup of the Evenks living in Northeastern China

The Solon people (simplified Chinese: 索伦; traditional Chinese: 索倫; pinyin: Suǒlún) are a subgroup of the Ewenki (Evenk) people of northeastern Asia. They live in China's Inner Mongolia Autonomous Region and Heilongjiang Province, and constitute the majority of China's Ewenki.

== Terminology and classification ==
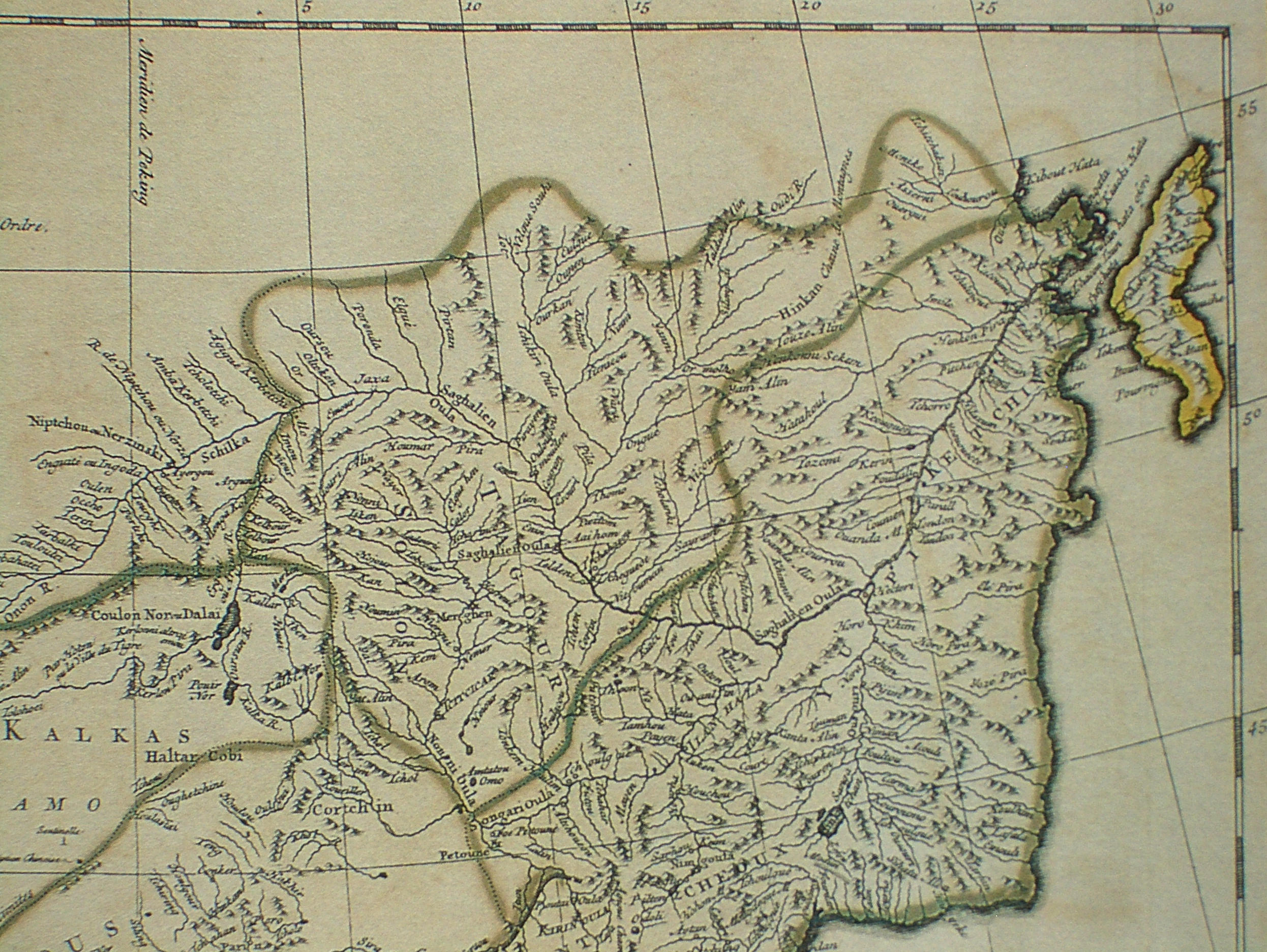
The lands of the Daur (Tagour) and Solon people shown east and west of the Nonni River on an early 18th-century Jesuit map

The Ewenki (also spelled Evenki) people are spread throughout the taiga forests of much of northeastern Asia, including most of Eastern Siberia and parts of Northeastern China. According to Juha Janhunen's classification, the Ewenki people found in China can be classified into three subethnic groups:

- The Solon (索伦鄂温克; Suǒlún Èwēnkè, "Solon Ewenki")
- The Oroqen
- The "Manchurian Reindeer Tungus" - a small group which are known to the Chinese as the "Yakut" (雅库特鄂温克; Yǎkùtè Èwēnkè, "Yakut Ewenki"). They are the only group in China engaged in reindeer herding.

Another subethnic group in China's Inner Mongolia, the Khamnigan, are bilingual, speaking the Ewenki language along with a Mongolian dialect. Janhunen believes that their primary ethnic affiliation is Mongolian rather than Ewenki, and does not include them into his classification of China's Ewenki.

The above classification is different from the PRC's official classification, according to which the Oroqen are considered a separate ethnic group, while the official Ewenki ethnic group of China includes not only the Solons and the "Manchurian Reindeer Tungus", but also the Khamnigan (or, officially, the "Tungus Ewenki", 通古斯鄂温克; Tōnggǔsī Èwēnkè).

As both the "Manchurian Reindeer Tungus" and the Khamnigans are quite small groups (perhaps around 200 persons in the former, and under 2,000 in the latter, as of the 1990s), the majority of the people classified as "Ewenki" in China are Solons. The Solon population was estimated as 7,200 in 1957, 18,000 in 1982, and 25,000 in 1990.

According to Janhunen's analysis, the Oroqen are in fact much closer to the "Ewenki proper" (i.e., the Evenks of Siberia) than the Solon are. The Solon are characterized by their close association with the Daur people. The Solons reside in the same areas where Daur do, in particular, in Evenk Autonomous Banner of Inner Mongolia, and elsewhere throughout the prefecture-level city of Hulunbuir. While the Solon language itself is a dialect of the Evenki language, most of the Solons are also bilingual in the Mongolic Daur language.

== History ==
Aiman (cf. Mongolian aimag "tribe, league") was the word Manchus used for the north Tungusic tribes of the Ewenki and Orochen which the Manchus incorporated into the Manchu banner system. The Kiler Ewenki had allied with the Cossack Russians unlike other Ewenki such as the Solon Ewenki under Qing rule. The Cossacks had hunted Aiman women as concubines and had children with them at Yaksa. The mixed children numbered 13 girls and 3 boys out of a total of 19 girls and 20 boys. There were 16 women and 155 men. In 1685 the Qing captured the mixed Cossack-Aiman children as well as the Cossacks, their Kiler Ewenki allies and some Orochen and incorporated them into the Ewenki and Oroqen banners.

The Albazinians were told to marry Solon Evenki widows by the Board of Rites.

The Solons were ordered by the Qianlong emperor to stop using firearms and instead practice traditional archery issuing an edict for silver taels to be issued for guns to be turned over to the government.

During 1900-1931 many Han Chinese merchants came to Heilongjiang where Solon lived. Solon women were raped by Han merchants and Solon men were enslaved by the Han Chinese merchant creditors after Solons went into debt to them while trading furs on credit for guns, liquor and tobacco from the Han Chinese merchants from Zhili and Shanxi.

=== In Xinjiang ===
In 1763, a number of Solon bannermen, along with their Daur and Xibe comrades-in-arms were resettled from Manchuria (Northeastern China) to the frontier regions of the recently conquered Xinjiang (see Dzungar–Qing Wars). These Solon became also known as the "Ongkor Solon". The presence of the Solons in the region is attested in numerous Russian accounts, in particular from the time of the Muslim minorities' war and its aftermath.

Unlike Xinjiang's Xibe, who preserve their ethnic identity into the 21st century, the less numerous Solon settlers gradually assimilated to the Dagur and Xibe. While over 100 Solons still lived in Xinjiang in 1905–1908, less than 20 people identified as Solon in the region in 1991. In 1990, only one Solon speaker remained in Xinjiang; he was 79 years old.

=== Penal servitude to Solon ===
The Qing dynasty often sent women and children of rebels as slaves to Solon (Evenks, Daur people, Oroqen people) garrisons in Ningguta in the Amur river drainage region of Heilongjiang and the Solin garrison in Ili (or Yili) in Dzungaria, Xinjiang. Muslim Uyghur women and children of rebels from a revolt in Uq Turpan were sent to Ili as slaves in 1765 after all the Uyghur male rebels were killed. A shrine in Uq turpan originally claimed to be of daughters of the prophet Sulayman during the Qing later in the 20th century was attributed to 7 Uyghur girls from 1765. Uyghur women and children were also given to Solon after a revolt in Kashgar in 1826. Uyghurs had a tale of a Uyghur woman named Nuzugum who was taken as a slave by an "infidel" Solon soldier in Ili from 1826 in an account recorded in 1882 by Bilal Nazim. Muslim Salar women and children were sent to Yili and Manchuria as slaves after a war in 1781. Eunuchs and slaves who committed infractions like theft and murder, who escaped multiple times or who were deemed to be uncontrollable were also sent to Ningguta as slaves of the Solon. Male slaves who committed robbery and murder or escaped multiple times were considered to difficult to control and were assigned to Oroqen. A eunuch stole the clothes of Lady Niohuru (Concubine Cheng (Qianlong)) in 1759 and was sent to Ningguta as punishment.

When the Qing forces under Zuo Zongtang put down the Dungan Revolt, the sons of Muslim Hui and Salar rebel leaders like Ma Benyuan (马本源) and Ma Guiyuan (马桂源) in Ningxia, Gansu and Qinghai were castrated by the Qing Imperial Household Department once they became 11 years old and were sent to work as eunuch slaves for Qing garrisons in Xinjiang and the wives of the rebel leaders were also enslaved. Among the Muslim boys were Ma Sanhe (马三和), Ma Qishizi (马七十子), Ma Shaqiang (马沙枪), Ma Suo (马锁), Ma Youzong (马由宗), Ma Feifei (马飞飞), Ma Wushijiu (马五十九), Ma Wushiliu (马五十六). Ma Jincheng, a son of the Hui Naqshbandi leader Ma Hualong was also castrated after being held in jail in Xi'an until he was 11 years old. The Imperial Household Department immediately castrated the 9 sons of Ma Guiyuan since they already reached age 12 and were enslave as eunuchs to Qing soldiers in Xinjiang. Ma Zhenyuan (马侦源), Ma Benyuan (马本源) and Ma Guiyuan's (马桂源) wives were all enslaved to soldiers and officials in provincial garrisons after the husbands were executed. Ma Yulong (马玉龙) was the father of the boys Ma Sanhe (马三和) and Ma Jibang (继邦). Ma Dingbang (马定邦) was the father of Ma Qishi (马七十), Ma Shaba (马沙把), Ma Suo (马锁) and Ma Youzong (;马由宗). Ma Chenglong (马成龙) was the father of Ma Feifei (马飞). Their sons were all sentenced to castration. The Muslim rebels themselves were subjected to execution by lingchi (slow slicing) while their sons were castrated and their female relatives enslaved to soldiers and officials in provincial garrisons. The children of the Muslim rebels who were under ten included 6 year old Ga Liu (尕六), 8 year old Ga Quan (尕全) and Ma Xier (马希儿) who were imprisoned until they reached 11 and then castrated by the Imperial Household Department.

Yaqub Beg and his son Ishana's corpses were "burned to cinders" in full public view. This angered the population in Kashgar, but Qing troops quashed a rebellious plot by Hakim Khan. Surviving members of Yaqub Beg's family included his four sons, four grandchildren (two grandsons and two granddaughters), and four wives. They either died in prison in Lanzhou, Gansu or were killed by the Qing government. His sons Yima Kuli, K'ati Kuli, Maiti Kuli, and grandson Aisan Ahung were the only survivors alive in 1879. They were all underage children at that time. They were put on trial and sentenced to an agonizing death if they were found to be complicit in their father's rebellious "sedition". If they were innocent, they were to be sentenced to castration and servitude as eunuch slaves to the Qing troops on the Amur frontier in Heilongjiang. Afterwards, when they reached the age of 11 years, they would be handed over to the Imperial Household to be executed or castrated. In 1879, it was confirmed that the sentence of castration was carried out, Yaqub Beg's son and grandsons were castrated by the Chinese court in 1879 and turned into eunuchs to work in the Imperial Palace. Yaqub Beg's sons and grandsons who were captured were under 10 years old Aisin Ahongju (爱散阿洪俱), Kadihuli (卡底胡里) and 10 year old Imahuli (依玛胡里).

=== Shamanism ===
There are few sources on the shamanism of the Ewenki peoples below the Amur/Helongkiang river in Northern China. There is a brief report of fieldwork conducted by Richard Noll and Kun Shi in 1994 of the life of the shamaness Dula'r (Ewenki name), also known as Ao Yun Hua (her Han Chinese name). She was born in 1920 and was living in the village of Yiming Gatsa in the Ewenki Banner (county) of the Hulunbuir Prefecture, in the Inner Mongolian Autonomous Region. While not a particularly good informant, she described her initiatory illness, her multiyear apprenticeship with a Mongol shaman before being allowed to heal at the age of 25 or 26, and the torments she experienced during the Cultural Revolution in the 1960s when most of her shamanic paraphernalia was destroyed. Mongol and Buddhist Lamaist influences on her indigenous practice of shamansim was evident. She hid her prize possession—an Abagaldi (bear spirit) shaman mask, which has also been documented among the Mongol and Daur peoples in the region. The field report and color photographs of this shaman are available online.

== See also ==
- Solun, Horqin Right Front Banner
- Qing Regulation of Solon Gun Ownership, by David Porter, Harvard University
