= Pavel Kudrin =

Russian footballer

Personal information
- Full name: Pavel Viktorovich Kudrin
- Date of birth: 20 February 1983 (age 43)
- Height: 1.86 m (6 ft 1 in)
- Position: Defender

Senior career*
| Years | Team | Apps | (Gls) |
| 2001 | FC Fakel Voronezh | 0 | (0) |
| 2002 | FC Lokomotiv Liski | 15 | (0) |
| 2005 | FC Dynamo Voronezh (amateur) | | |
| 2006 | FC Fakel Voronezh | 32 | (0) |
| 2007–2008 | FC Rotor Volgograd | 2 | (0) |
| 2009 | FC Fakel-Voronezh Voronezh | 1 | (0) |
- * Club domestic league appearances and goals

Pavel Viktorovich Kudrin (Russian: Павел Викторович Кудрин; born 20 February 1983) is a former Russian professional football player.

== Club career ==
He played in the Russian Football National League for FC Fakel Voronezh in 2006.
