= Evenki people =

Tungusic ethnic group of North Asia

Evenki
эвэнкил
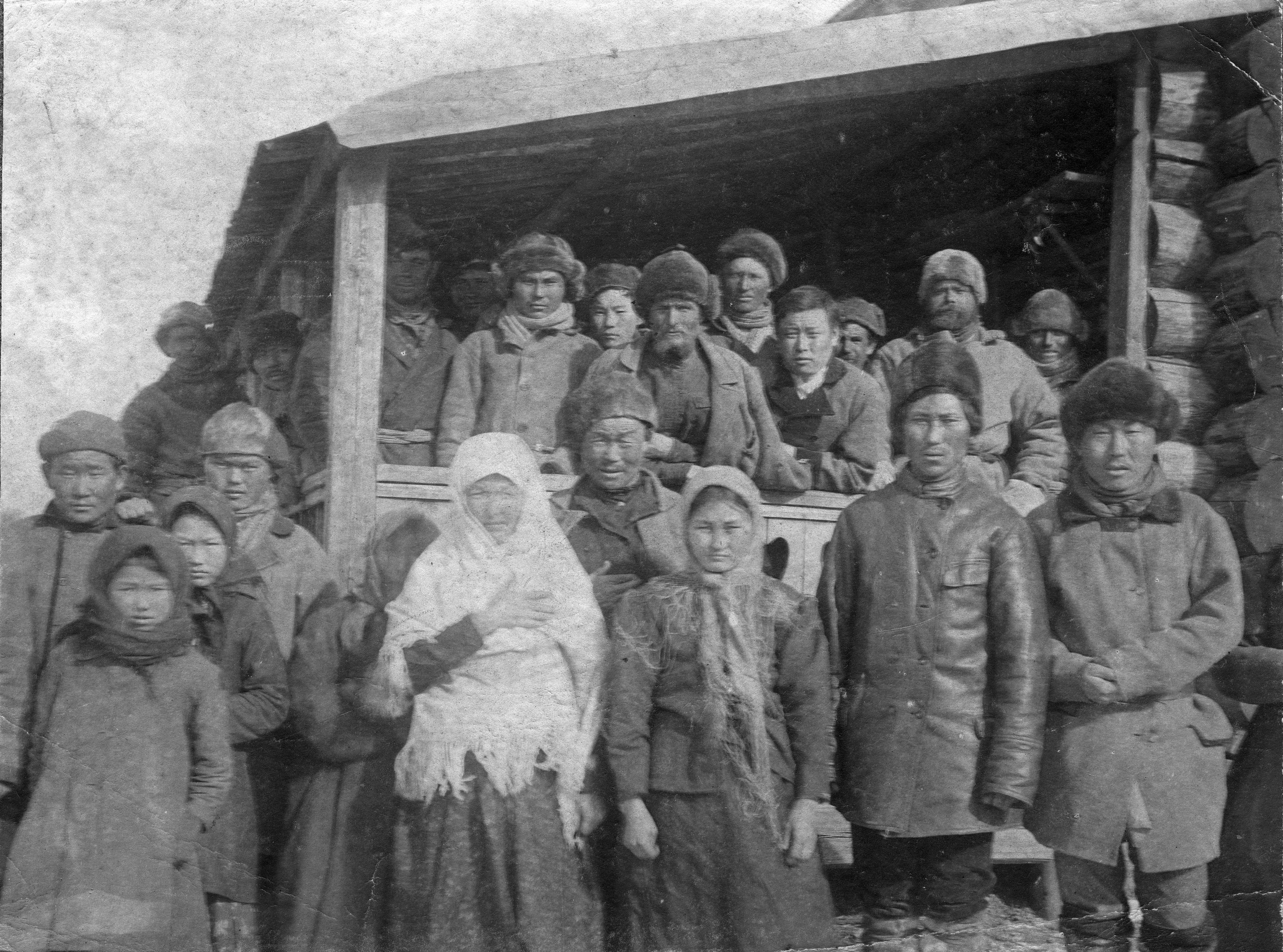
- An Evenki family in the early 1900s

Regions with significant populations
- Russia: 39,226
- China: 34,617
- Mongolia: 537

Languages
- Evenki, Yakut, Russian, Chinese

Religion
- Shamanism, Eastern Orthodox Christianity, Tibetan Buddhism (in Buryatia)

Related ethnic groups
- Evens, Oroqens, Oroch

Evenki people

Chinese name
- Simplified Chinese: 鄂温克族
- Traditional Chinese: 鄂溫克族
Transcriptions
Standard Mandarin
- Hanyu Pinyin: Èwēnkè Zú

Alternative Chinese name
- Chinese: 埃文基族
Transcriptions
Standard Mandarin
- Hanyu Pinyin: Āiwénjī Zú

Mongolian name
- Mongolian Cyrillic: Хамниган
Transcriptions
- SASM/GNC: Khamnigan

Russian name
- Russian: Эвенки
- Romanization: Evenki

Evenki name
- Evenki: Эвэнкил / Evenkīl / ᠧᠸᠧᠩᠺᠢ

The Evenki, (Note: The Chinese government uses the English spelling Ewenki.) or Tungusy, (Note: According to Nedjalkov 1997, p. xix, "Tungusy" could be a Chinese exonym.) are a Tungusic people of North Asia. In Russia, the Evenki are recognised as one of the Indigenous peoples of the Russian North, with a population of 38,396 (2010 census). In China, the Evenki form one of the 56 ethnic groups officially recognised by the government, with a population of 34,617 (2020 census). There are 537 Evenki in Mongolia (2015 census), called Khamnigan in the Mongolian language.

== Origin ==
The Evenki are sometimes conjectured to be connected to the Shiwei people who inhabited the Greater Khingan Range in the 5th to 9th centuries, although the native land of the majority of Evenki people is in the vast regions of Siberia between Lake Baikal and the Amur River. The Evenki language forms the northern branch of the Manchu-Tungusic language group and is closely related to Even and Negidal in Siberia. By 1600 the Evenki or Ewenki of the Lena and Yenisey river valleys were successful reindeer herders. By contrast the Solons (ancestors of the Evenkis in China) and the Khamnigans (Ewenkis of Transbaikalia) had picked up horse breeding and the Mongolian deel from the Mongols. The Solons nomadized along the Amur River. They were closely related to the Daur people. To the west the Khamnigan were another group of horse-breeding Evenki in the Transbaikalia area. Also in the Amur valley a body of Siberian Evenki-speaking people were called Orochen by the Manchus.

=== Historical distribution ===
The ancestors of the south-eastern Evenki most likely lived in the Baikal region of Southern Siberia (near the modern-day Mongolian border) since the Neolithic era.

Considering the north-western Evenki, Vasilevich claims: "The origin of the Evenki is the result of complex processes, different in time, involving the mixing of different ancient aboriginal tribes from the north of Siberia with tribes related in language to the Turks and Mongols. The language of these tribes took precedence over the languages of the aboriginal population". Elements of more modern Evenki culture, including conical tent dwellings, bone fish-lures, and birch-bark boats, were all present in sites that are believed to be Neolithic. From Lake Baikal, "they spread to the Amur and Okhotsk Sea ... the Lena Basin ... and the Yenisey Basin".

=== Contact with Russians ===
In the 17th century, the Russian Empire made contact with the Evenki. Cossacks, who served as a kind of "border-guard" for the tsarist government, imposed a fur tax on the Siberian tribes. The Cossacks exploited the Evenki clan hierarchy, taking hostages from the highest members to ensure payment of the tax. Although there was some rebellion against local officials, the Evenki generally recognized the need for peaceful cultural relations with the Russians. The Russians and their constant demands for fur taxes pushed the Evenki east all the way to Sakhalin island, where some still live today. In the 19th century, some groups migrated south and east into Mongolia and Manchuria. Today, there are still Evenki populations in Sakhalin, Mongolia, and Manchuria, and to a lesser extent, their traditional Baikal region. Russian invasion of the Evenki caused them (and other Indigenous peoples) language erosion, a decline in traditions, and identity loss, among others. This was especially true during the Soviet regime. Soviet policies of collectivization, forced sedentarization (sometimes referred to as sedentism), "unpromising villages", and Russification of the education system compromised social, cultural, and mental well-being of the Evenki.

== Evenki of Russia ==
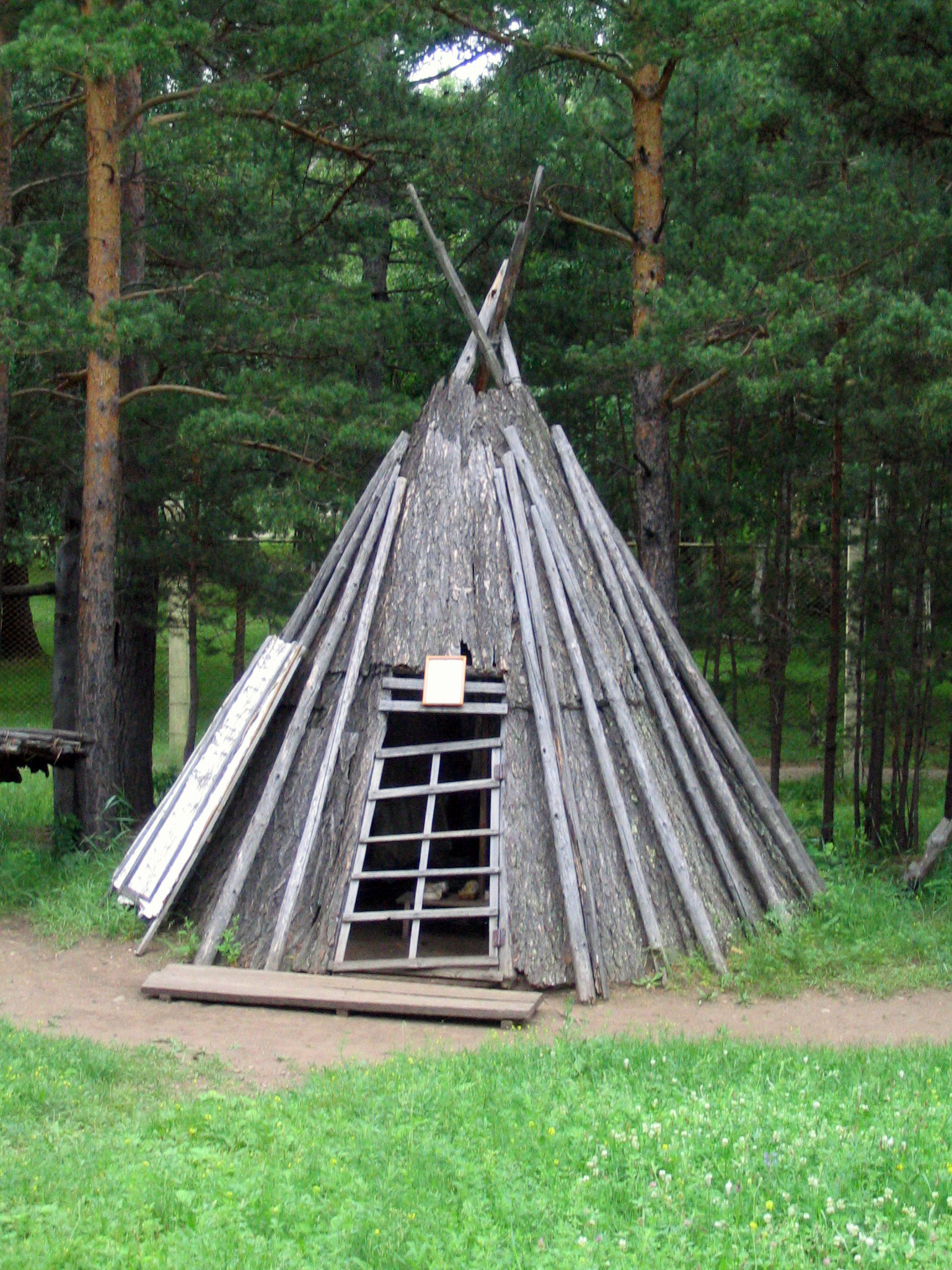
An Evenki chum at an ethnographic museum in Ulan Ude, Russia

The Evenki were formerly known as tungus. This designation was spread by the Russians, who acquired it from the Yakuts (in the Yakut language tongus) in the 17th century. The Evenki have several self-designations, of which the best known is evenk. This became the official designation for the people in 1931. Some groups call themselves orochen ('an inhabitant of the River Oro'), orochon ('a rearer of reindeer'), ile ('a human being'), etc. At one time or another tribal designations and place names have also been used as self-designations, for instance manjagir, birachen, solon, etc. Several of these have even been taken for separate ethnic entities.

There is also a similarly named Siberian group called the Evens (formerly known as Lamuts). Although related to the Evenki, the Evens are now considered to be a separate ethnic group.

The Evenki are spread over a huge territory of the Siberian taiga from the River Ob in the west to the Okhotsk Sea in the east, and from the Arctic Ocean in the north to Manchuria and Sakhalin in the south. The total area of their habitat is about 2,500,000 km^{2}. In all of Russia only the Russians inhabit a larger territory. According to the administrative structure, the Evenki live, from west to east, in:

- Tyumen Oblast
- Tomsk Oblast
- Krasnoyarsk Krai
- Evenkiysky District (old Evenk Autonomous Okrug)
- Irkutsk Oblast
- Chita Oblast
- Amur Oblast
- Republic of Buryatia
- Sakha Republic
- Khabarovsk Krai
- Sakhalin Oblast

However, the territory where they are a titular nation is confined solely to the Evenk Autonomous Okrug, where 3,802 of the 35,527 Evenki live (according to the 2002 census). More than 18,200 Evenki live in the Sakha Republic.

Evenki is the largest of the northern group of the Manchu-Tungus languages, a group which also includes Even and Negidal.

Many Evenki in Russia still engage in a traditional lifestyle of raising reindeer, fishing, and hunting.

=== Census results ===
According to the 2021 census 39,226 Evenki lived in Russia.

Evenki in Russia
Administrative unit	Evenki population (2021 census)
Sakha (Yakutia) Republic	24,334
Krasnoyarsk Krai (including Evenkia)	3,612
Evenk Autonomous Okrug (Evenkia)	3,118
Krasnoyarsk Krai (excluding Evenkia)	494
Khabarovsk Krai	3,709
Amur Oblast	1,405
Sakhalin Oblast	171
Republic of Buryatia	2,995
Irkutsk Oblast	1,144
Zabaykalsky Krai	957

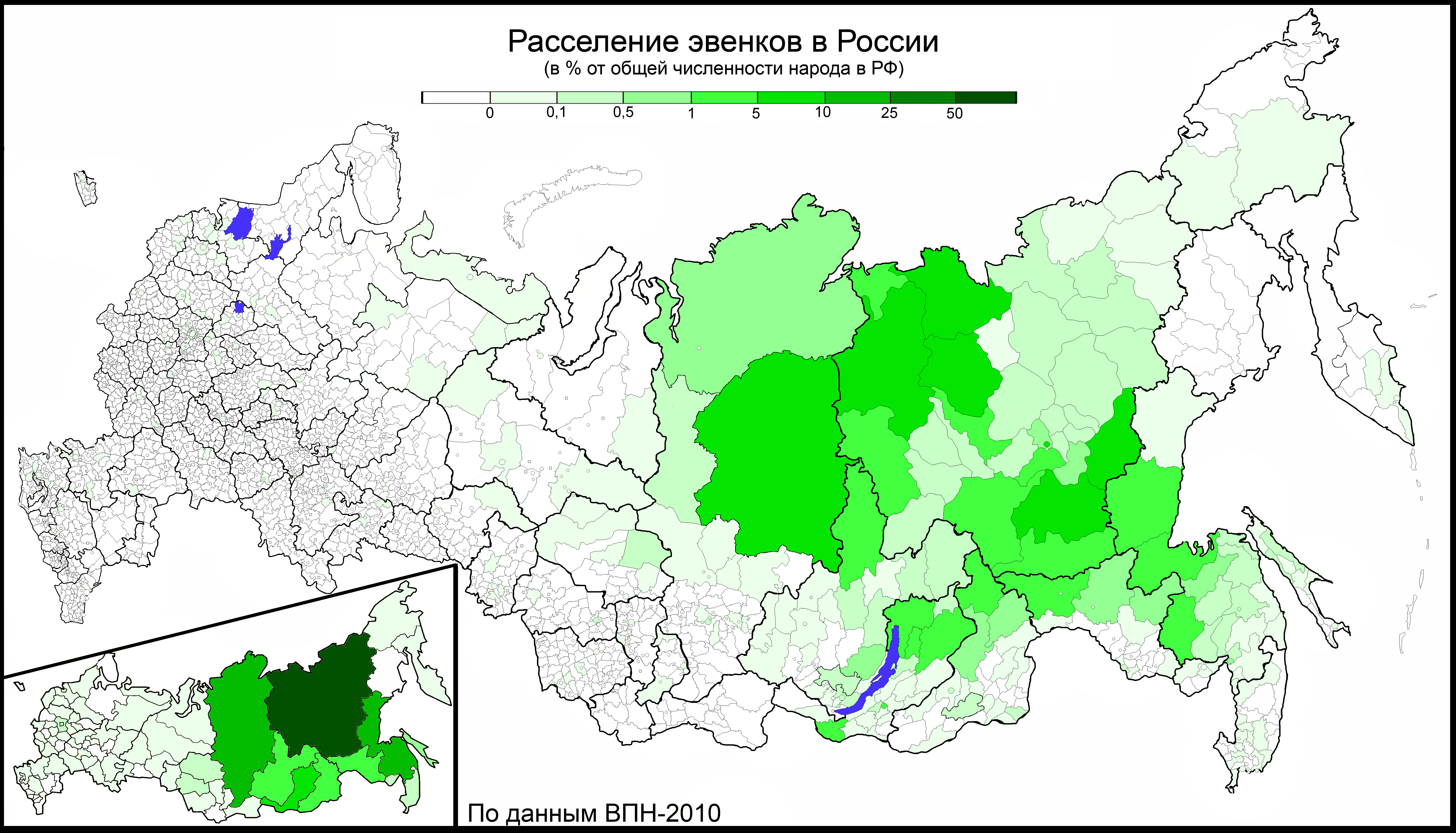
Evenki settlement in Russia by municipal areas and urban districts in percents of the total number of this nation in the Russian Federation. According to the 2010 census

Settlement of Evenks in the Siberian Federal District by urban and rural settlements in%, 2010 census

Settlement of Evenks in the Far Eastern Federal District by urban and rural settlements in%, 2010 census

== Evenki of China ==
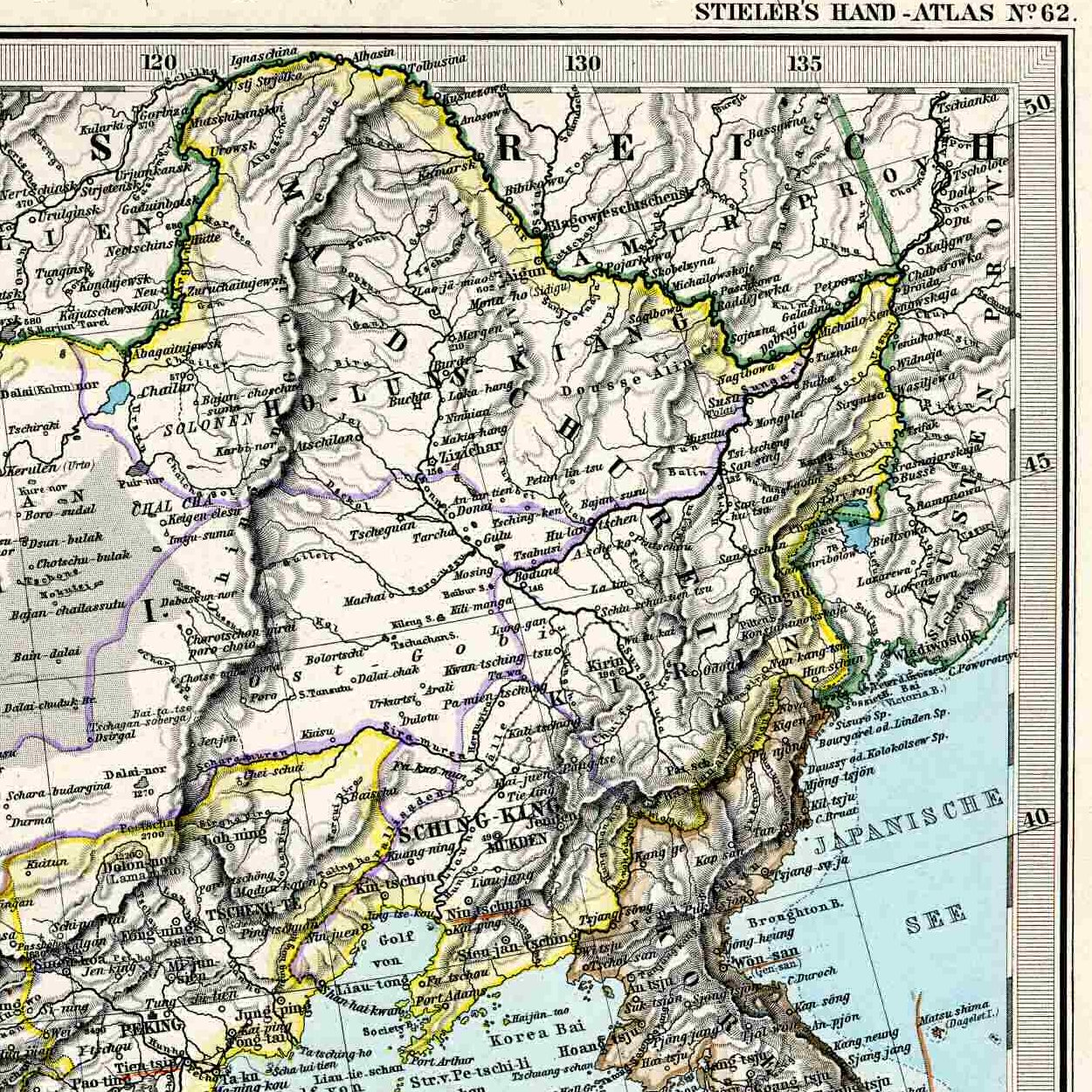
The lands of the Solons (Solonen) near Hailar (Chailar) in the late Qing Empire

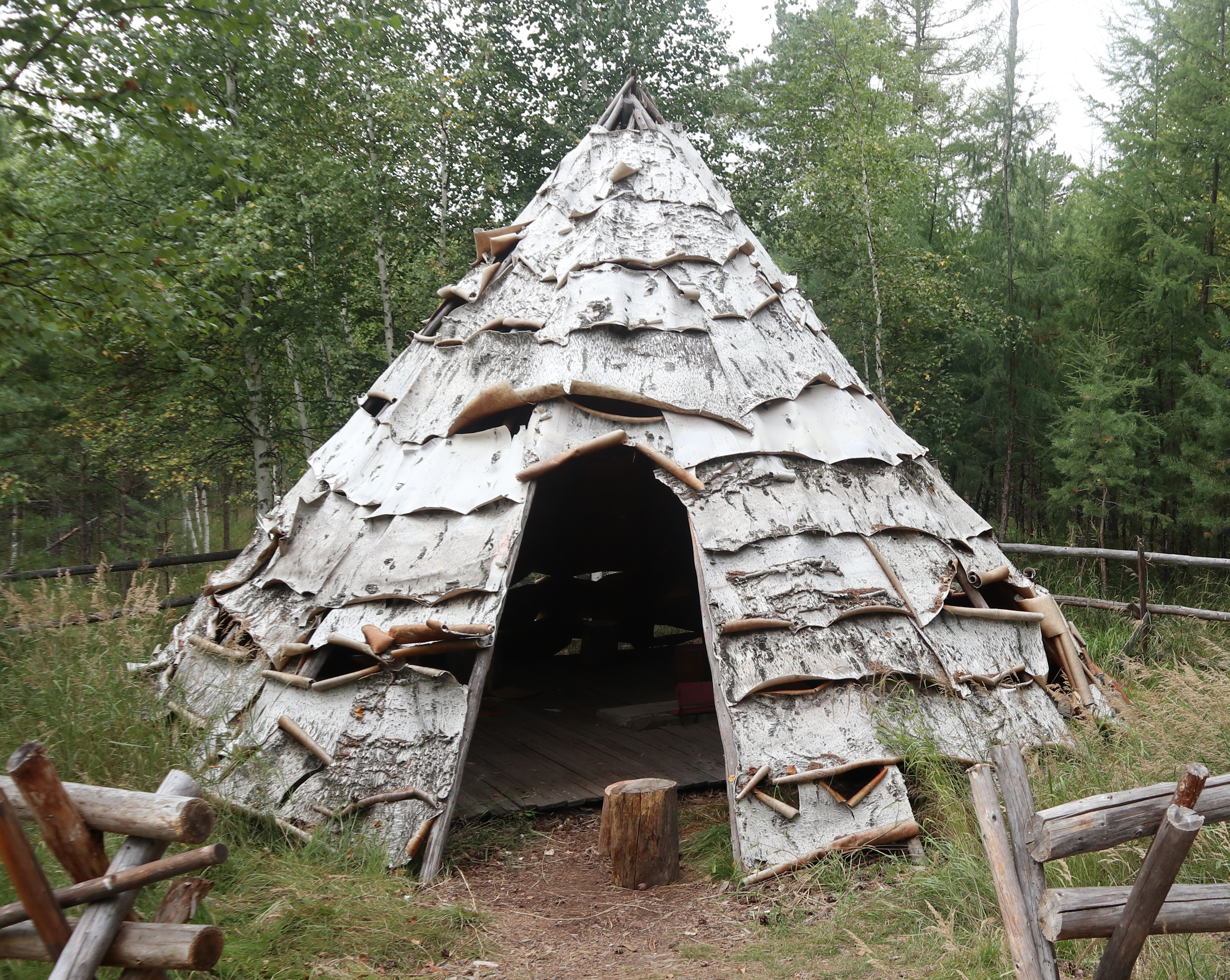
An Evenki chum made from birch bark, Heilongjiang

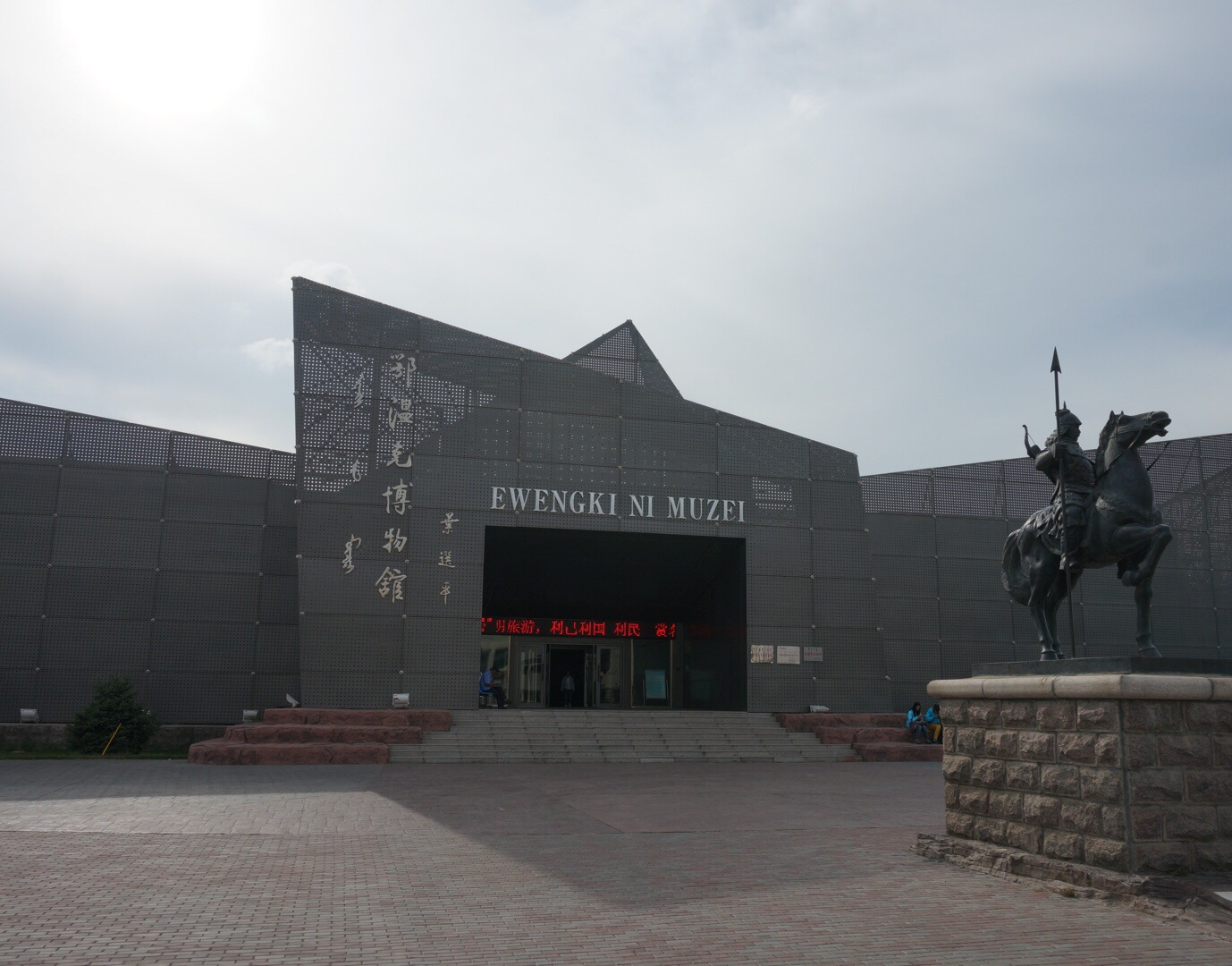
Evenki Museum in the Ewenki Autonomous Banner

At the 2000 census, there were 30,505 Evenki in China, mainly made up of the Solons and the Khamnigans. 88.8% of China's Evenki live in the Hulunbuir region in the north of the Inner Mongolia Province, near the city of Hailar. The Ewenki Autonomous Banner is also located near Hulunbuir. There are also around 3,000 Evenki in neighbouring Heilongjiang Province.

The Manchu Emperor Hong Taiji conquered the Evenki in 1640, and executed their leader Bombogor. After the Manchu conquest, the Evenki were incorporated into the Eight Banners.

In 1763, the Qing government moved 500 Solon Evenki and 500 Daur families to the Tacheng and Ghulja areas of Xinjiang, in order to strengthen the empire's western border. Another 1020 Xibe families (some 4000 persons) also came the following year. Since then, however, the Solons of Xinjiang have assimilated into other ethnic groups, and are not identified as such anymore.

The Japanese occupation led to many murders of Evenkis, and Evenki men were conscripted as scouts and rangers by the Japanese secret service in 1942. Some Evenkis fled to Soviet Siberia across the Amur river after murdering a Japanese officer to avoid punishment from the Japanese.

The Evenki of China today tend to be settled pastoralists and farmers.

=== By county ===
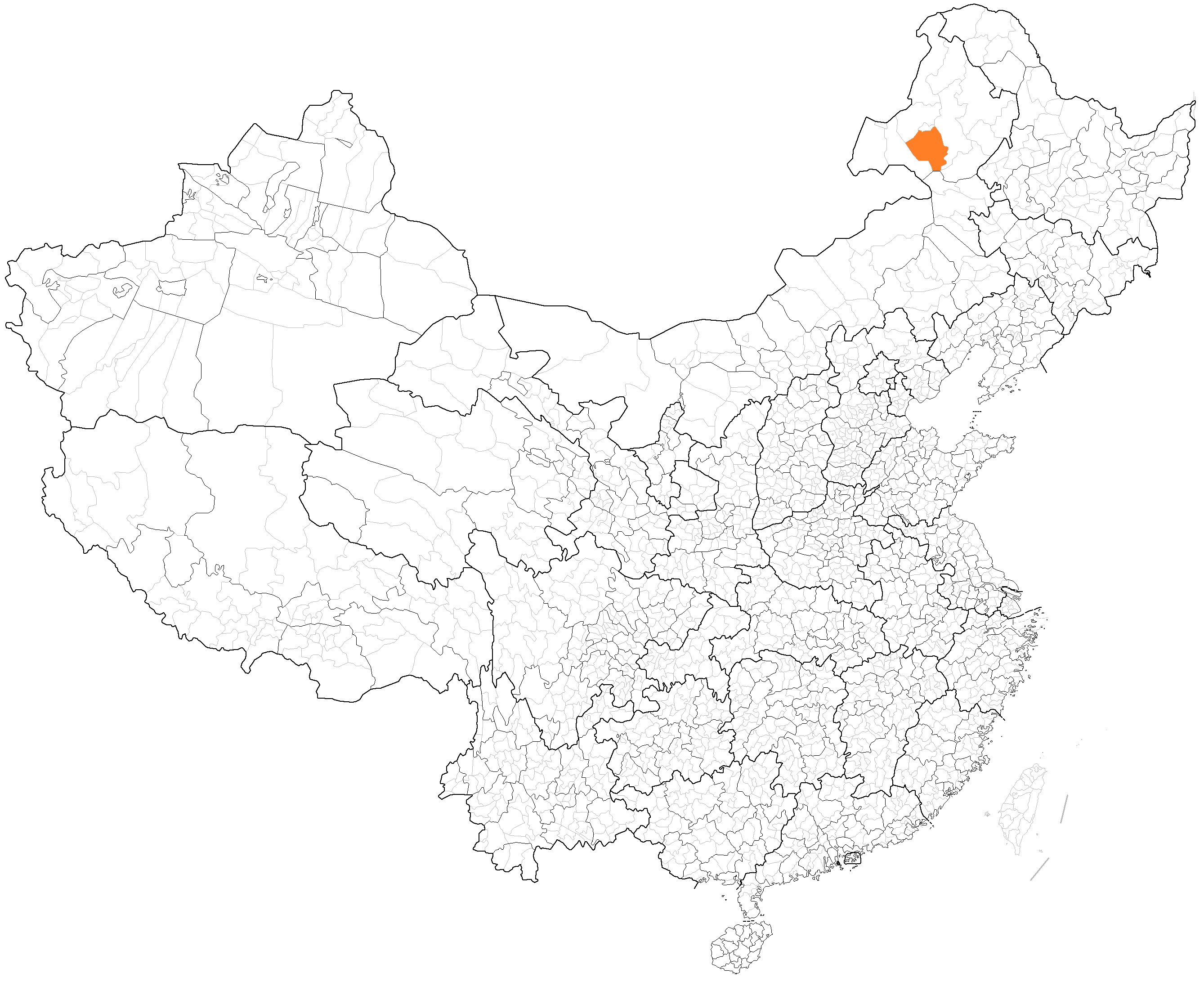
Map of Evenk-designated autonomous prefectures and counties in China

County-level distribution of the Evenk

(Only includes counties or county-equivalents containing >0.1% of China's Evenki population.)

Provincial-level administrative division	Prefecture-level division	County-level division	Evenki Population	% of China's Evenki Population
Inner Mongolia AR	Hulunbuir	Ewenki Autonomous Banner	9,733	31.91%
Inner Mongolia AR	Hulunbuir	Morin Dawa Daur Autonomous Banner	5,126	16.8%
Inner Mongolia AR	Hulunbuir	Oroqen Autonomous Banner	3.155	10.34%
Inner Mongolia AR	Hulunbuir	Arun Banner	2,144	7.03%
Inner Mongolia AR	Hulunbuir	Old Barag Banner	1,906	6.25%
Inner Mongolia AR	Hulunbuir	Zhalantun	1,201	3.94%
Inner Mongolia AR	Hulunbuir	Hailar District	971	3.18%
Heilongjiang	Qiqihar	Nehe	778	2.55%
Heilongjiang	Heihe	Nenjiang	678	2.22%
Inner Mongolia AR	Hulunbuir	Yakeshi	405	1.33%
Inner Mongolia AR	Hulunbuir	Genhe	369	1.21%
Inner Mongolia AR	Hohhot	Saihan District	158	0.52%
Inner Mongolia AR	Hulunbuir	Manzhouli	141	0.46%
Heilongjiang	Qiqihar	Meilisi Daur District	135	0.44%
Heilongjiang	Daxing'anling	Jagdaqi	129	0.42%
Inner Mongolia AR	Hohhot	Xincheng District	128	0.42%
Heilongjiang	Qiqihar	Fuyu	111	0.36%
Inner Mongolia AR	Hulunbuir	Ergun	110	0.36%
Inner Mongolia AR	Hulunbuir	New Barag Left Banner	103	0.34%
Beijing Municipality		Haidian District	68	0.22%
Heilongjiang	Qiqihar	Jianhua District	65	0.21%
Heilongjiang	Qiqihar	Tiefeng	65	0.21%
Inner Mongolia AR	Hinggan League	Ulanhot	60	0.20%
Heilongjiang	Qiqihar	Gangnan District	59	0.19%
Heilongjiang	Daxing'anling	Mohe	55	0.18%
Heilongjiang	Qiqihar	Hulan Ergi	54	0.18%
Inner Mongolia AR	Hulunbuir	New Barag Right Banner	54	0.18%
Heilongjiang	Daxing'anling	Huma	52	0.17%
Inner Mongolia AR	Hohhot	Huimin District	48	0.16%
Heilongjiang	Qiqihar	Longjiang	44	0.14%
Heilongjiang	Qiqihar	Longsha	36	0.12%
Inner Mongolia AR	Baotou	Qingshan	35	0.11%
Inner Mongolia AR	Tongliao	Horqin District	35	0.11%
Inner Mongolia AR	Hinggan League	Jalaid Banner	34	0.11%
Inner Mongolia AR	Heihe	Wudalianchi	32	0.10%
Other			2,228	7.33%

== Evenki of Ukraine ==
According to the 2001 census, there were 48 Evenki living in Ukraine. The majority (35) stated that their native language was Russian; four indicated Evenki as their native language, and three said that it was Ukrainian.

== Traditional life ==
Traditionally they were a mixture of pastoralists and hunter-gatherers—they relied on their domesticated reindeer for milk and transport and hunted other large game for meat. Today "[t]he Evenki are divided into two large groups ... engaging in different types of economy. These are the hunting and reindeer-breeding Evenki ... and the horse and cattle pastoral Evenki as well as some farming Evenki". The Evenki lived mostly in taiga, or boreal forest. They lived in conical tents made from birch bark or reindeer skin tied to birch poles. When they moved camp, the Evenki would leave these frameworks and carry only the more portable coverings. During winter, the hunting season, most camps consisted of one or two tents while spring encampments had up to 10 households

Their skill at riding their domesticated reindeer allowed the Evenki to "colonize vast areas of the eastern taiga which had previously been impenetrable" The Evenki used a saddle unique to their culture, placed on the shoulders of the reindeer to lessen the strain on the animal, and used a stick rather than stirrups to balance. Evenki did not develop reindeer sledges until comparatively recent times They instead used their reindeer as pack animals and often traversed great distances on foot, using snowshoes or skis. The Evenki people did hunt and eat wild reindeer, but not their domesticated reindeer, which they kept for milk.

Large herds of reindeer were very uncommon. Most Evenki had around 25 head of reindeer, because they were generally bred for transportation. Unlike in several other neighboring tribes Evenki reindeer-breeding did not include "herding of reindeer by dogs nor any other specific features". Very early in the spring season, winter camps broke up and moved to places suitable for calving. Several households pastured their animals together throughout the summer, being careful to keep "[s]pecial areas ... fenced off ... to guard the newborn calves against being trampled on in a large herd"

=== Clothing ===
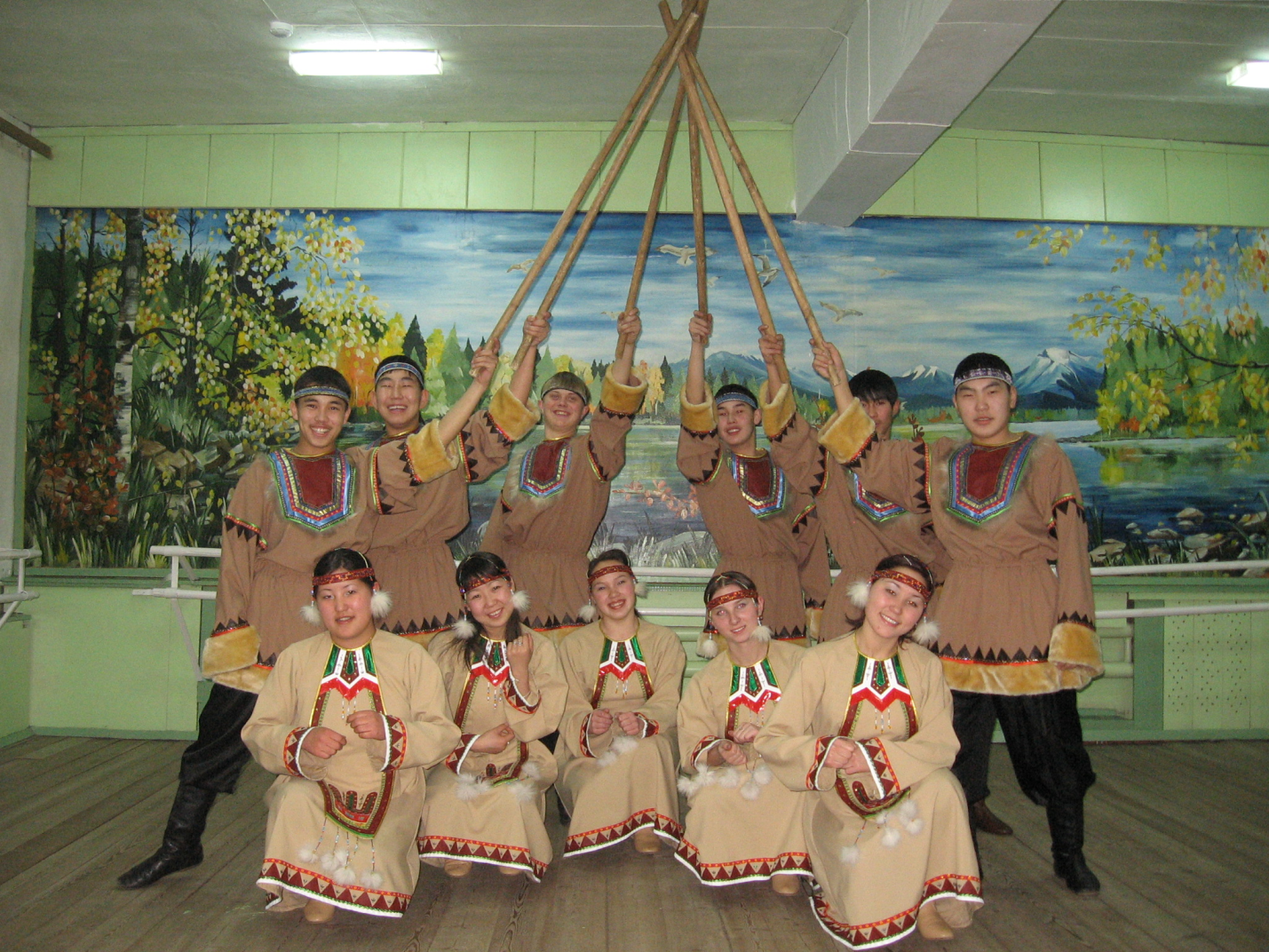
Evenki in traditional clothing

The Evenki wore a characteristic garb "adapted to the cold but rather dry climate of the Central Siberia and to a life of mobility ... they wore brief garments of soft reindeer or elk skin around their hips, along with leggings and moccasins, or else long supple boots reaching to the thigh" (49). They also wore a deerskin coat that did not close in front but was instead covered with an apron-like cloth. Some Evenkis decorated their clothing with fringes or embroidery (50). The Evenki traditional costume always consisted of these elements: a loincloth made of animal hide, leggings, and boots of varying lengths Facial tattooing was also very common.

=== Hunting ===
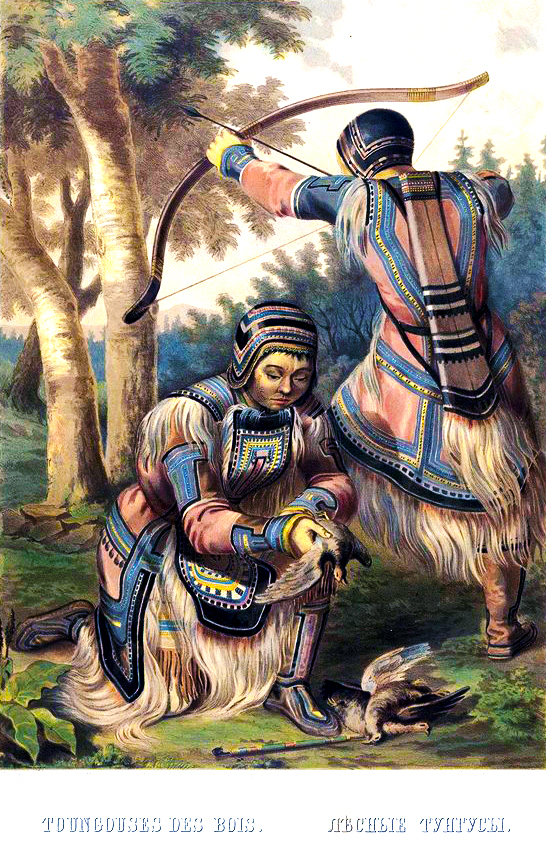
An 1862 painting depicting Evenki hunting

The traditional Evenki economy was a mix of pastoralism (horses or reindeer), fishing, and hunting. The Evenki who lived near the Okhotsk Sea hunted seal, but for most of the taiga-dwellers, elk, wild reindeer, and fowl were the most important game animals. Other animals included "roe deer, bear, wolverine, lynx, wolf, Siberian marmot, fox, and sable" Trapping did not become important until the imposition of the fur tax by the tsarist government. Before they acquired guns in the 18th century, Evenki used steel bows and arrows. Along with their main hunting implements, hunters always carried a "pike"—"which was a large knife on a long handle used instead of an axe when passing through thick taiga, or as a spear when hunting bear". The Evenki have deep respect for animals and all elements of nature: "It is forbidden to torment an animal, bird, or insect, and a wounded animal must be finished off immediately. It is forbidden to spill the blood of a killed animal or defile it. It is forbidden to kill animals or birds that were saved from pursuit by predators or came to a person for help in a natural disaster."

== Religion ==
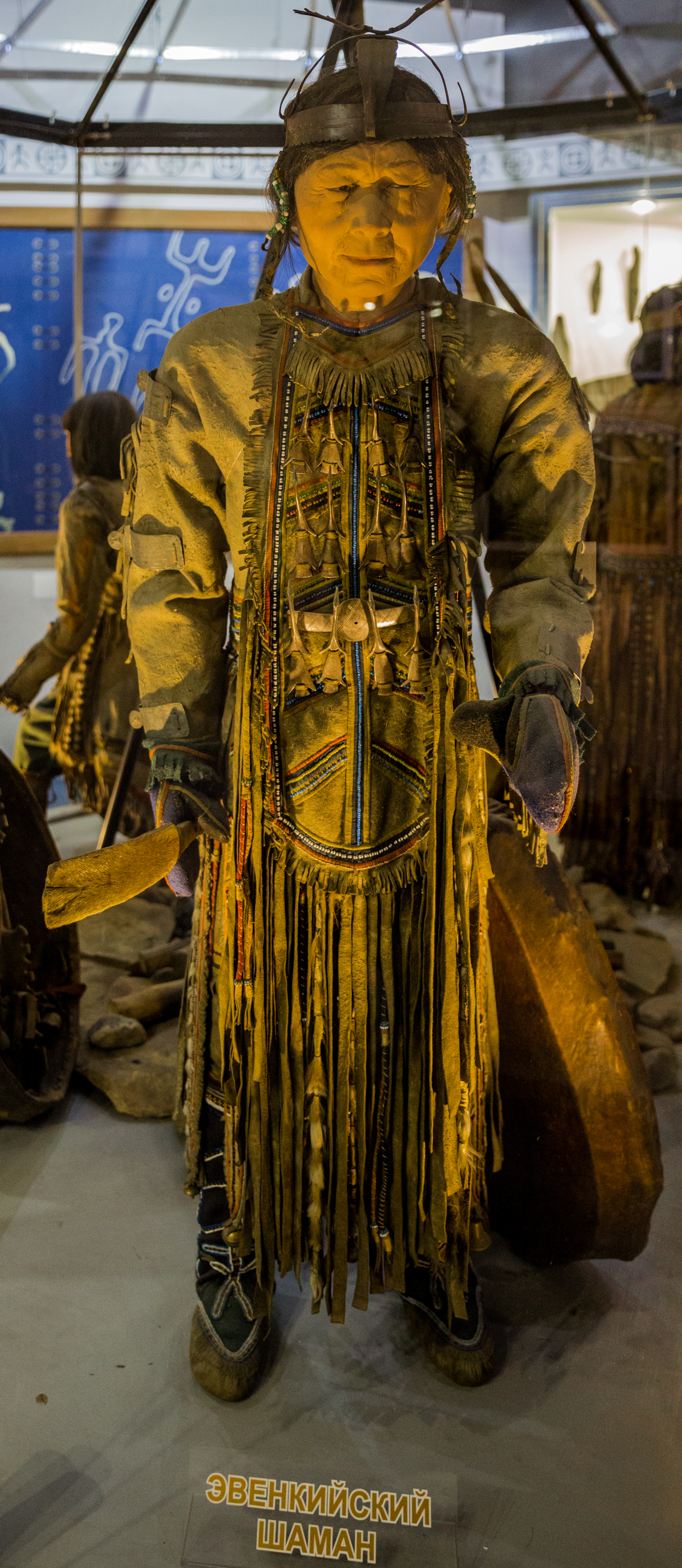
Costume of an Evenki shaman in Krasnoyarsk

Prior to contact with the Russians, the belief system of the Evenki was animistic. Many have adopted Tibetan Buddhism.

The Evenki, like most nomadic, pastoral, and subsistence agrarian peoples, spend most of their lives in very close contact with nature. Because of this, they develop what A. A. Sirina calls an "ecological ethic". By this she means "a system of responsibility of people to nature and her spirit masters, and of nature to people"(9). Sirina interviewed many Evenki who until very recently spent much of their time as reindeer herders in the taiga, just like their ancestors. The Evenki people also spoke along the same lines: their respect for nature and their belief that nature is a living being.

This idea, "[t]he embodiment, animation, and personification of nature—what is still called the animistic worldview—is the key component of the traditional worldview of hunter-gatherers" Although most of the Evenkis have been "sedentarized"—that is, made to live in settled communities instead of following their traditional nomadic way of life —"[m]any scholars think that the worldview characteristic of hunter-gatherer societies is preserved, even if they make the transition to new economic models.

Although nominally Christianized in the 18th century, the Evenki people maintain many of their historical beliefs—especially shamanism The Christian traditions were "confined to the formal performance of Orthodox rites which were usually timed for the arrival of the priest in the taiga".

The religious beliefs and practices of the Evenki are of great historical interest since they retain some archaic forms of belief. Among the most ancient ideas are spiritualization and personification of all natural phenomena, belief in an upper, middle, and lower world, belief in the soul (omi) and certain totemistic concepts. There were also various magical rituals associated with hunting and guarding herds. Later on, these rituals were conducted by shamans. Shamanism brought about the development of the views of spirit-masters.

There are few sources on the shamanism of the Evenki peoples below the Amur/Helongkiang river in Northern China. There is a brief report of fieldwork conducted by Richard Noll and Kun Shi in 1994 of the life of the shamaness Dula'r (Evenki name), also known as Ao Yun Hua (her Han Chinese name). She was born in 1920 and was living in the village of Yiming Gatsa in the Evenki Banner (county) of the Hulunbuir Prefecture, in the Inner Mongolian Autonomous Region. While not a particularly good informant, she described her initiatory illness, her multiyear apprenticeship with a Mongol shaman before being allowed to heal at the age of 25 or 26, and the torments she experienced during the Cultural Revolution in the 1960s when most of her shamanic paraphernalia was destroyed. Mongol and Buddhist Lamaist influences on her Indigenous practice of shamansim were evident. She hid her prize possession—an Abagaldi (bear spirit) shaman mask, which has also been documented among the Mongols and Dauer peoples in the region. The field report and color photographs of this shaman are available online.

Olga Kudrina (c. 1890–1944) was a shaman among the Reindeer Evenki of northern Inner Mongolia along the Amur River's Great Bend (today under the jurisdiction of Genhe, Hulunbuir).

== Genetics ==
40 percent of Evenki men carry haplogroup C-M217. Their second most common Y-DNA haplogroup is N (34%). 18 percent belong to its subgroup N1b-P43 and 16 percent belong to subgroup N1c. Other paternal haplogroups found among them are R1a (14%), R1b (6%), F (4%) and I (2%).

== Notable Evenki ==
- Bombogor (died 1640), leader of Evenki federation
- Olga Kudrina (c. 1890–1944), shaman
- Semyon Nomokonov (1900–1973), sniper during World War II
- Nikita Sakharov (1915–1945), poet, prose writer
- Alitet Nemtushkin (1939–2006), poet
- Maria Fedotova-Nulgynet (born 1946), poet, children's writer, storyteller
- Galina Varlamova (1951–2019), writer, philologist, folklorist
- Ureltu (born 1952), writer
- D. O. Chaoke (born 1958), linguist

== Gallery ==
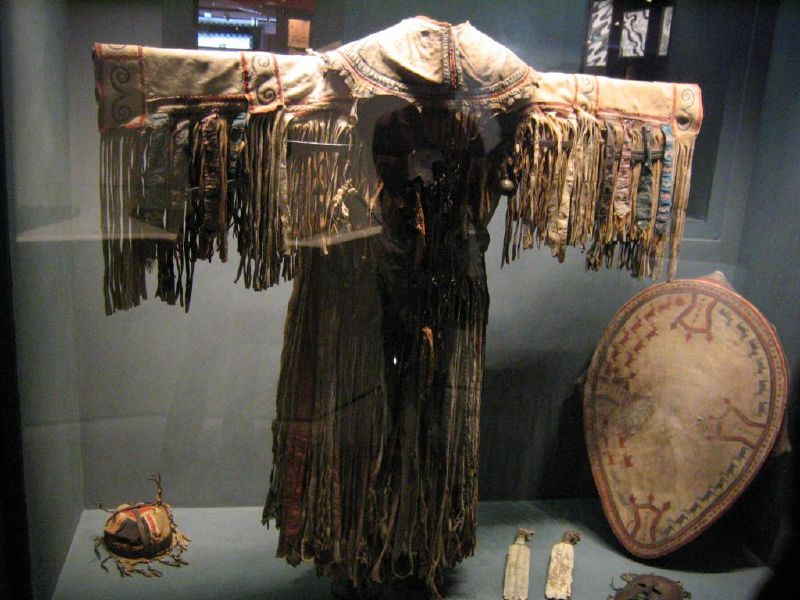
Shaman costume

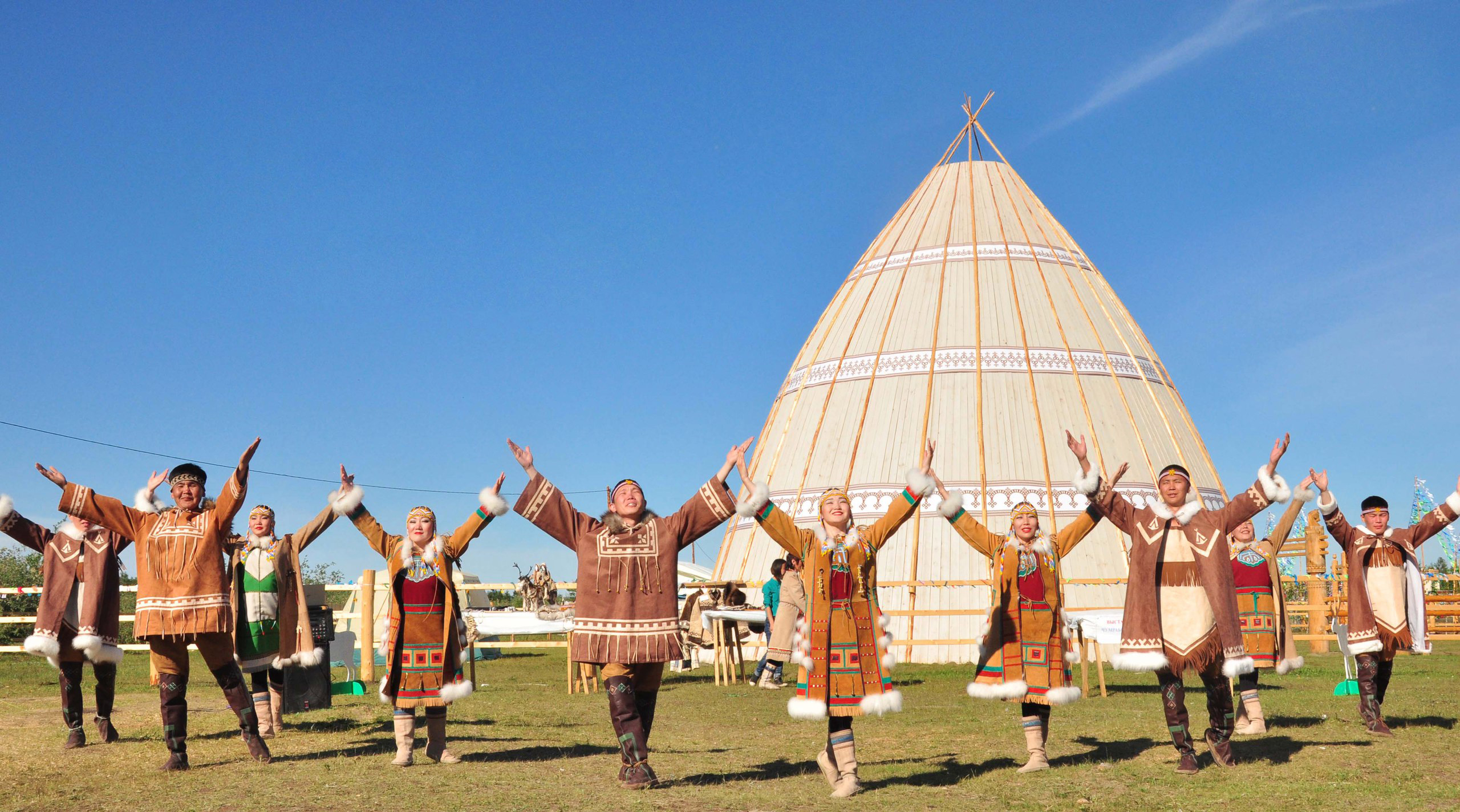
Folk ensemble Osiktakan

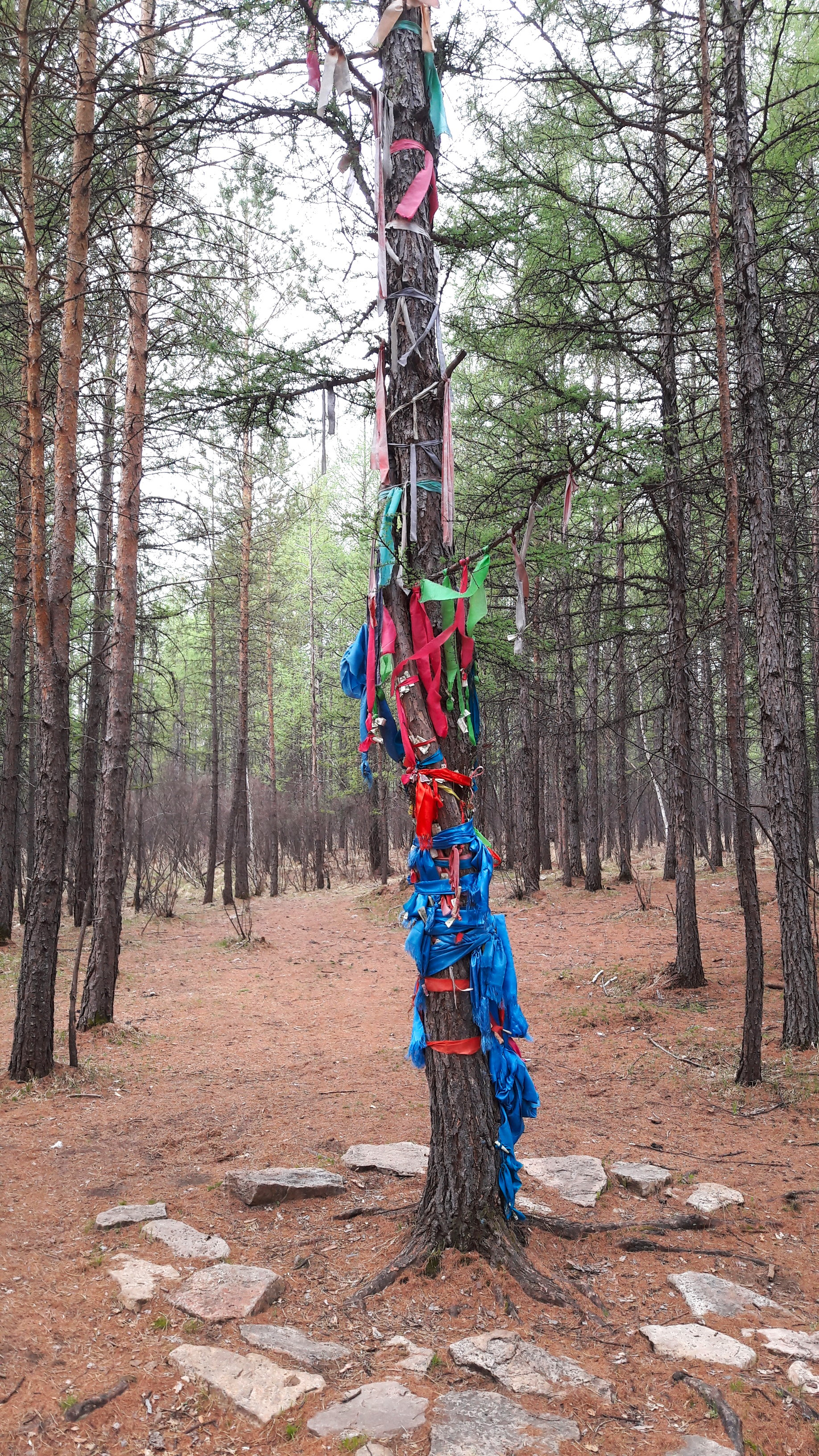
Spirit tree in Genhe, China

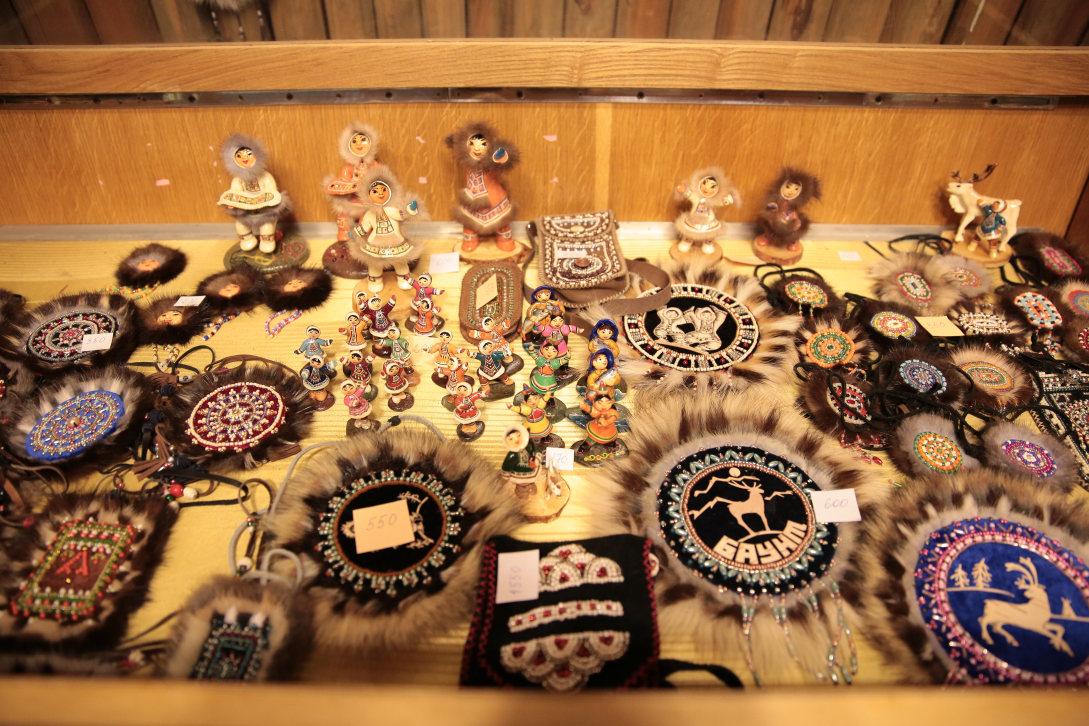
Evenki handiwork

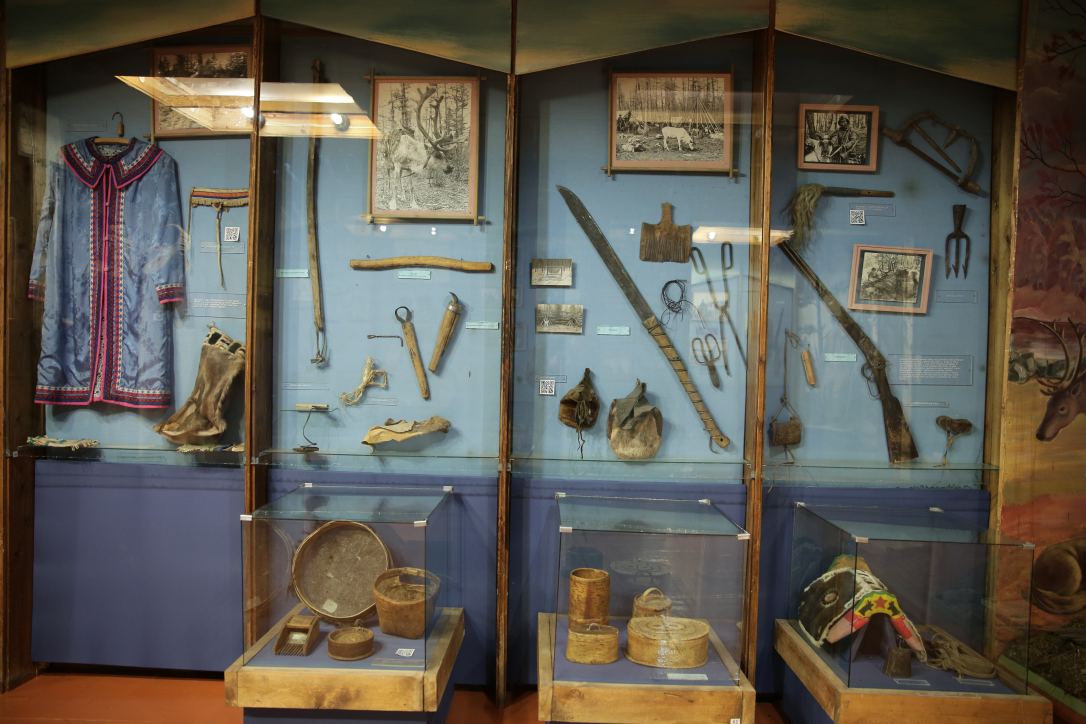
Evenki tools

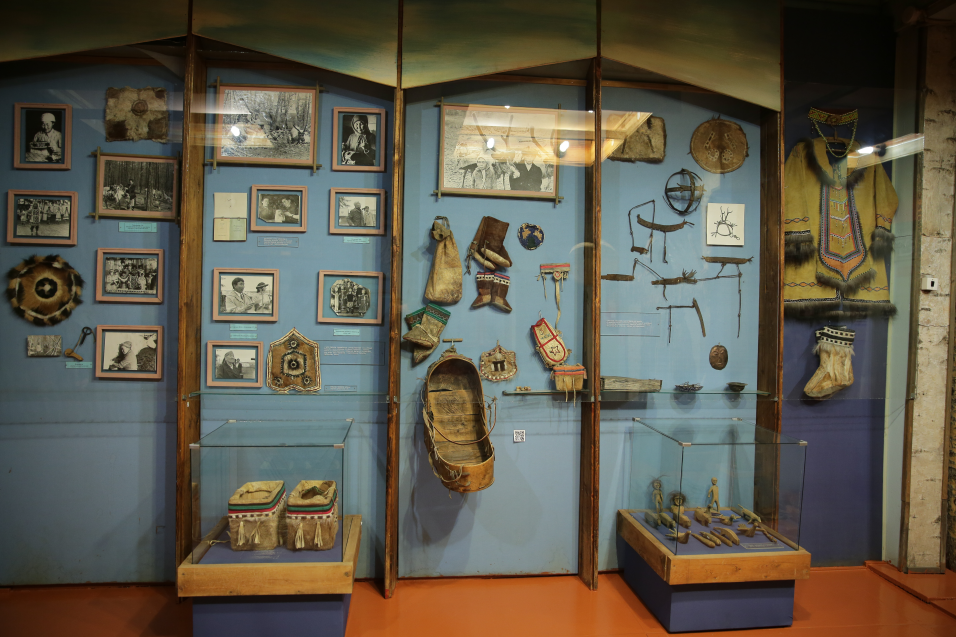
Evenki tools

== See also ==
- Hamnigan (Hamnigan Mongols)
- Bokon / Yungyuele / Nyukzha

== Bibliography ==
- "Altaic." Columbia Electronic Encyclopedia. 6th ed. 2009. Academic Search Premier. EBSCO. Web. 4 Nov. 2009.
- Anderson, David G. "Is Siberian Reindeer Herding in Crisis? Living with Reindeer Fifteen Years after the End of State Socialism." Nomadic Peoples NS 10.2 (2006): 87–103. EBSCO. Web. 6 Nov. 2009.
- Bulatova, Nadezhda, and Lenore Grenoble. Evenki. Munchen: LINCOM Europa, 1999. Print. Languages of the World.
- Chaoke, D. O.; Wang, Lizhen (2002). 鄂温克族宗教信仰与文化. Beijing: Minzu University of China. ISBN 978-7-81056-700-8. Archived from the original (Zipped NLC (Modified JBIG)) on 2011-07-20.
  - (The online edition needs a Book Reader for NLC and a ZIP extractor)
- "Evenki." Cassell's Peoples, Nations, and Cultures. Weidenfeld & Nicolson, 2005. EBSCO. Web. 4 Nov. 2009.
- "Evenki." Ethnologue: Languages of the World, Sixteenth Edition. Ed. Paul M. Lewis. SIL International, 2009. Web. 8 Dec. 2009.
- Fondahl, Gail. Gaining ground? Evenkis, land and reform in southeastern Siberia. Boston: Allyn and Bacon, 1998. Print.
- Forsyth, James. History of the Peoples of Siberia: Russia's North Asian Colony, 1581–1990. Cambridge: Cambridge UP, 1992. Print.
- Georg, Stefan, Peter A. Michalove, Alexis M. Ramer, and Paul J. Sidwell. "Telling general linguists about Altaic." Journal of Linguistics 35.1 (1999): 65–98. JSTOR. Web. 8 Dec. 2009.
- Hallen, Cynthia L. "A Brief Exploration of the Altaic Hypothesis." Department of Linguistics. Brigham Young University, 6 Sept. 1999. Web. 8 Dec. 2009.
- Janhunen, Juha. "Evenki." Interactive Atlas of the World's Languages in Danger. Ed. Christopher Moseley. UNESCO Culture Sector, 31 Mar. 2009. Web. 8 Dec. 2009.
- Nedjalkov, Igor (1997), Evenki, London: Routledge, ISBN 978-0-415-02640-6
- Sirina, Anna A. Katanga Evenkis in the 20th Century and the Ordering of their Life-world, transl. from 2nd Russian edn (2002), Northern Hunter-Gatherers Research Series 2, Edmonton: CCI Press and Baikal Archaeology Project, 2006.
- Sirina, Anna A. "People Who Feel the Land: The Ecological Ethic of the Evenki and Eveny." Trans. James E. Walker. Anthropology & Archaeology of Eurasia 3rd ser. 47.Winter 2008-9 (2009): 9–37. EBSCOHost. Web. 27 November 2009.
- Turov, Mikhail G. Evenki Economy in the Central Siberian Taiga at the Turn of the 20th Century: Principles of Land Use, transl. from 2nd Russian edn (1990), Northern Hunter-Gatherers Research Series 5, Edmonton: CCI Press and the Baikal Archaeology Project, 2010.
- Vasilevich, G. M., and A. V. Smolyak. "Evenki." The Peoples of Siberia. Ed. Stephen Dunn. Trans. Scripta Technica, Inc. Chicago: The University of Chicago, 1964. 620-54. Print.
- Vitebsky, Piers. Reindeer people: Living with Animals and Spirits in Siberia. Boston: Houghton Mifflin, 2005. Print.
- Wood, Alan, and R. A. French, eds. Development of Siberia: People and Resources. New York: St. Martin's, 1989. Print.

=== In literature ===
- Chi, Zijian (2013). 《额尔古纳河右岸》 [The Last Quarter of the Moon]. Translated by Humes, Bruce. Harvill Secker..
- The Moose of Ewenki 《鄂温克的驼鹿》, picture book written by Gerelchimeg Blackcrane (格日勒其木格·黑鹤), illustrated by Jiu Er (九儿), translated by Helen Mixter . (Greystone Kids, 2019)
