= Ewenki Autonomous Banner =

Ewenki Banner 鄂温克旗 • ᠡᠸᠡᠩᠬᠢ ᠬᠣᠰᠢᠭᠤ • ᠧᠸᠧᠩᠺᠢ ᠭᠣᠰ (Chinese) • (Mongolian) • (Ewenki)
- Autonomous banner
- Ewenki Autonomous Banner 鄂温克族自治旗 ᠡᠸᠡᠩᠬᠢ ᠥᠪᠡᠷᠲᠡᠭᠡᠨ ᠵᠠᠰᠠᠬᠤ ᠬᠣᠰᠢᠭᠤ • ᠧᠸᠧᠩᠺᠢ ᠠᠶᠢᠮᠠᠨᠨᠢ ᠮᠧᠧᠨᠵᠢ ᠵᠣᠬᠠᠷ ᠭᠣᠰ
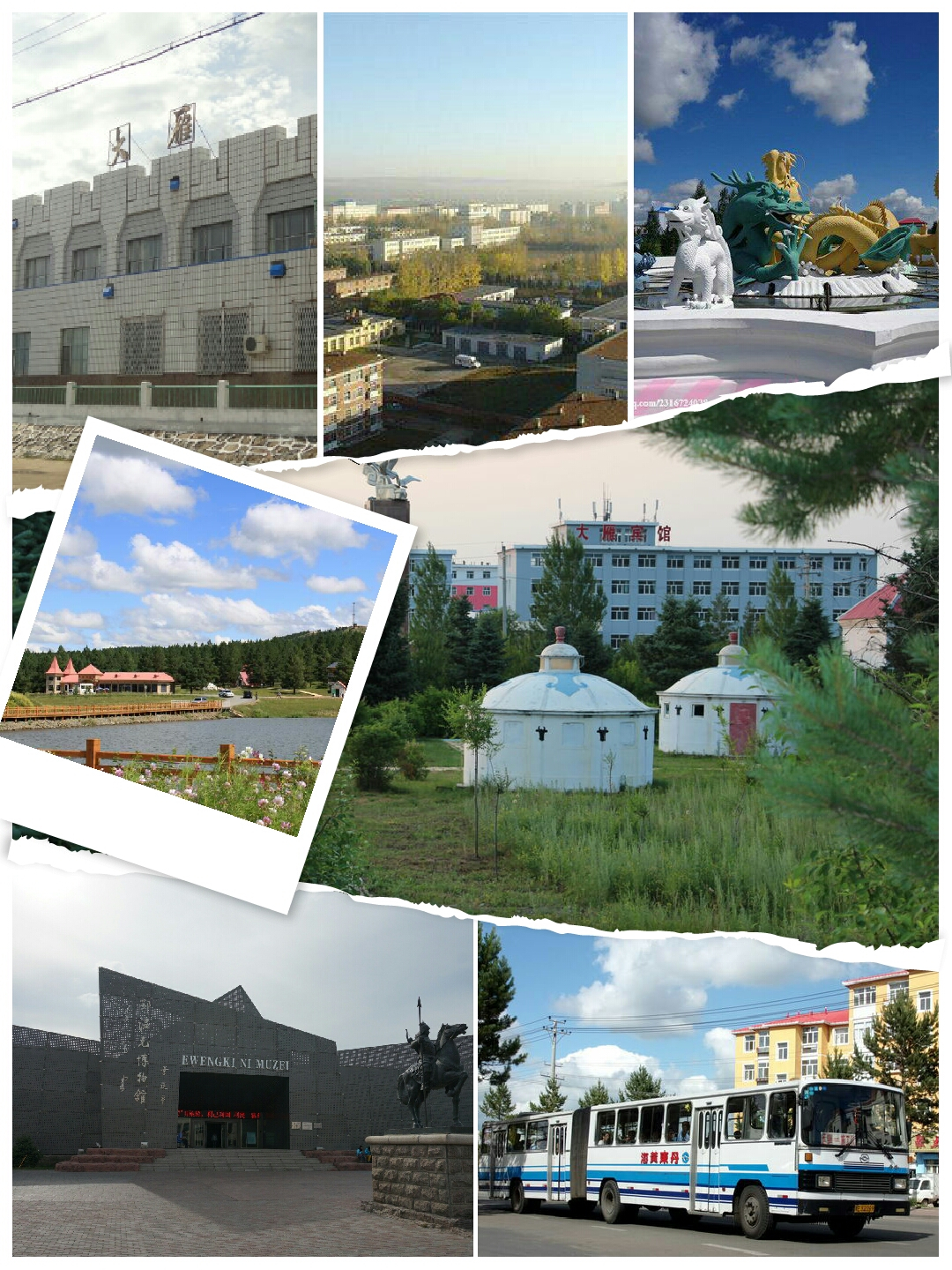

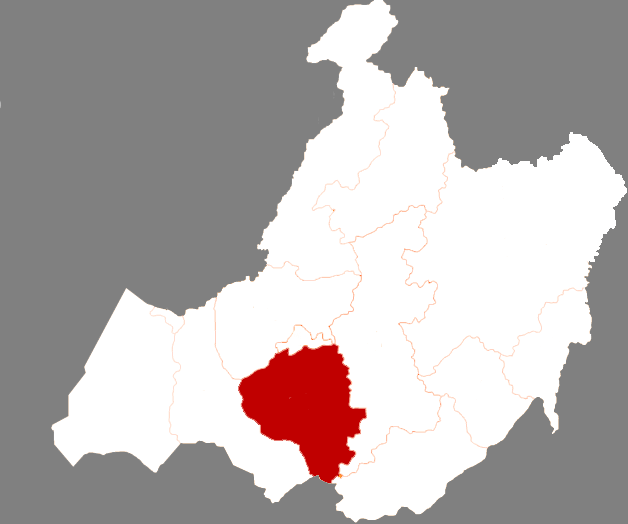
- Ewenki Banner in Hulunbuir

- Location in Inner Mongolia Ewenki (China)
- Coordinates (Ewenki Banner government): 49°08′48″N 119°45′19″E
- Country: China
- Autonomous region: Inner Mongolia
- Prefecture-level city: Hulunbuir
- Banner seat: Bayan Tohoi

Area
  - Total: 19,111 km^{2} (7,379 sq mi)

Population (2020)
  - Total: 141,102
  - Density: 7.3833/km^{2} (19.123/sq mi)
- Time zone: UTC+8 (China Standard)
- Postal code: 021100
- Website: www.ewenke.gov.cn

Ewenki Autonomous Banner

Chinese name
- Simplified Chinese: 鄂温克族自治旗
- Traditional Chinese: 鄂溫克族自治旗
Transcriptions
Standard Mandarin
- Hanyu Pinyin: Èwēnkèzú Zìzhìqí

Mongolian name
- Mongolian Cyrillic: Эвэнк өөртөө засах хошуу
- Mongolian script: ᠡᠸᠡᠩᠬᠢ ᠥᠪᠡᠷᠲᠡᠭᠡᠨ ᠵᠠᠰᠠᠬᠤ ᠬᠣᠰᠢᠭᠤ
Transcriptions
- SASM/GNC: Eveŋki öbertegen jasaqu qosiɣu

Evenki name
- Evenki: ᠧᠸᠧᠩᠺᠢ ᠠᠶᠢᠮᠠᠨᠨᠢ ᠮᠧᠧᠨᠵᠢ ᠵᠣᠬᠠᠷ ᠭᠣᠰ; Ewengki Aimanni Mvvngkeng Isihēr Gosa; Эвенки Аймани Мвенкен Исихер Госа

Ewenki Autonomous Banner or Evenk Autonomous Banner (Evenki: ; Mongolian: ᠡᠸᠡᠩᠬᠢ ᠥᠪᠡᠷᠲᠡᠭᠡᠨ ᠵᠠᠰᠠᠬᠤ ᠬᠣᠰᠢᠭᠤ; Chinese: 鄂温克族自治旗) is an autonomous banner that lies on the border between northwestern Greater Khingan and Hulun Buir grasslands and directly south of the urban district of Hailar in the prefecture-level city of Hulunbuir, China. The autonomous banner has an area of 19,111 km^{2} (7,379 sq mi), and a population of 136,832 as of 2019. The banner's seat of government is the town of Bayan Tohoi. The most populous town in the banner is Dayan, which was once Dayan Mining Area as an administrative division and is now the main part of an industrial district also named Dayan Mining Area, has an area of 443 square kilometres (171 mi^{2}) and a population of about 73,000.

== Administrative divisions ==
The banner is divided into 4 towns, 1 ethnic township, and 5 sums. These subdivisions are further divided into 44 Gacha and 20 Residential Communities. The banner's seat of government is the town of Bayan Tohoi.

| Name | Simplified Chinese | Hanyu Pinyin | Mongolian (Hudum Script) | Mongolian (Cyrillic) | Administrative division code | Notes |
|---|---|---|---|---|---|---|
Towns
| Bayan Tohoi | 巴彦托海镇 | Bāyàntuōhǎi Zhèn | ᠪᠠᠶᠠᠨᠲᠣᠬᠣᠢ ᠪᠠᠯᠭᠠᠰᠤ | Баяндахуй балгас | 150724100 | |
| Dayan | 大雁镇 | Dàyàn Zhèn | ᠳ᠋ᠠ ᠶᠠᠨ ᠪᠠᠯᠭᠠᠰᠤ | Да яан балгас | 150724110 | |
| Imin Gol | 伊敏河镇 | Yīmǐnhé Zhèn | ᠢᠮᠢᠨ ᠭᠣᠣᠯ ᠪᠠᠯᠭᠠᠰᠤ | Имин гол балгас | 150724111 | |
| Hongholji | 红花尔基镇 | Hónghuā'ěrjī Zhèn | ᠬᠣᠩᠭᠣᠯᠵᠢ ᠪᠠᠯᠭᠠᠰᠤ | Хонголж балгас | 150724112 | |
Ethnic township
| Bayan Tal Daur Ethnic Township | 巴彦塔拉达斡尔民族乡 | Bāyàntǎlā Dáwò'ěr Mínzúxiāng | ᠪᠠᠶᠠᠨᠲᠠᠯ᠎ᠠ ᠳᠠᠭᠤᠷ ᠦᠨᠳᠦᠰᠦᠲᠡᠨ ᠦ ᠰᠢᠶᠠᠩ | Баянтөл дагуур үндэстэний шиян | 150724213 | (Daur); Bayn tal Daor aimn tors |
Sums
| Bayan Qagan Sum | 巴彦嵯岗苏木 | Bāyàncuógǎng Sūmù | ᠪᠠᠶᠠᠨᠴᠠᠭᠠᠨ ᠰᠤᠮᠤ | Баянцагаан сум | 150724210 | |
| Xinhen West Sum | 锡尼河西苏木 | Xīníhéxī Sūmù | ᠰᠢᠨᠡᠬᠡᠨ ᠪᠠᠷᠠᠭᠤᠨ ᠰᠤᠮᠤ | Шинэхэн баруун сум | 150724211 | |
| Xinhen East Sum | 锡尼河东苏木 | Xīníhédōng Sūmù | ᠰᠢᠨᠡᠬᠡᠨ ᠵᠡᠭᠦᠨ ᠰᠤᠮᠤ | Шинэхэн зүүн сум | 150724212 | |
| Imin Sum | 伊敏苏木 | Yīmǐn Sūmù | ᠢᠮᠢᠨ ᠰᠤᠮᠤ | Имин сум | 150724214 | |
| Hui Sum | 辉苏木 | Huī Sūmù | ᠬᠤᠢ ᠰᠤᠮᠤ | Хой сум | 150724215 | |

Other: Bayan Tohoi Economic Development Zone (巴彦托海经济开发区)

== Geography and Climate ==
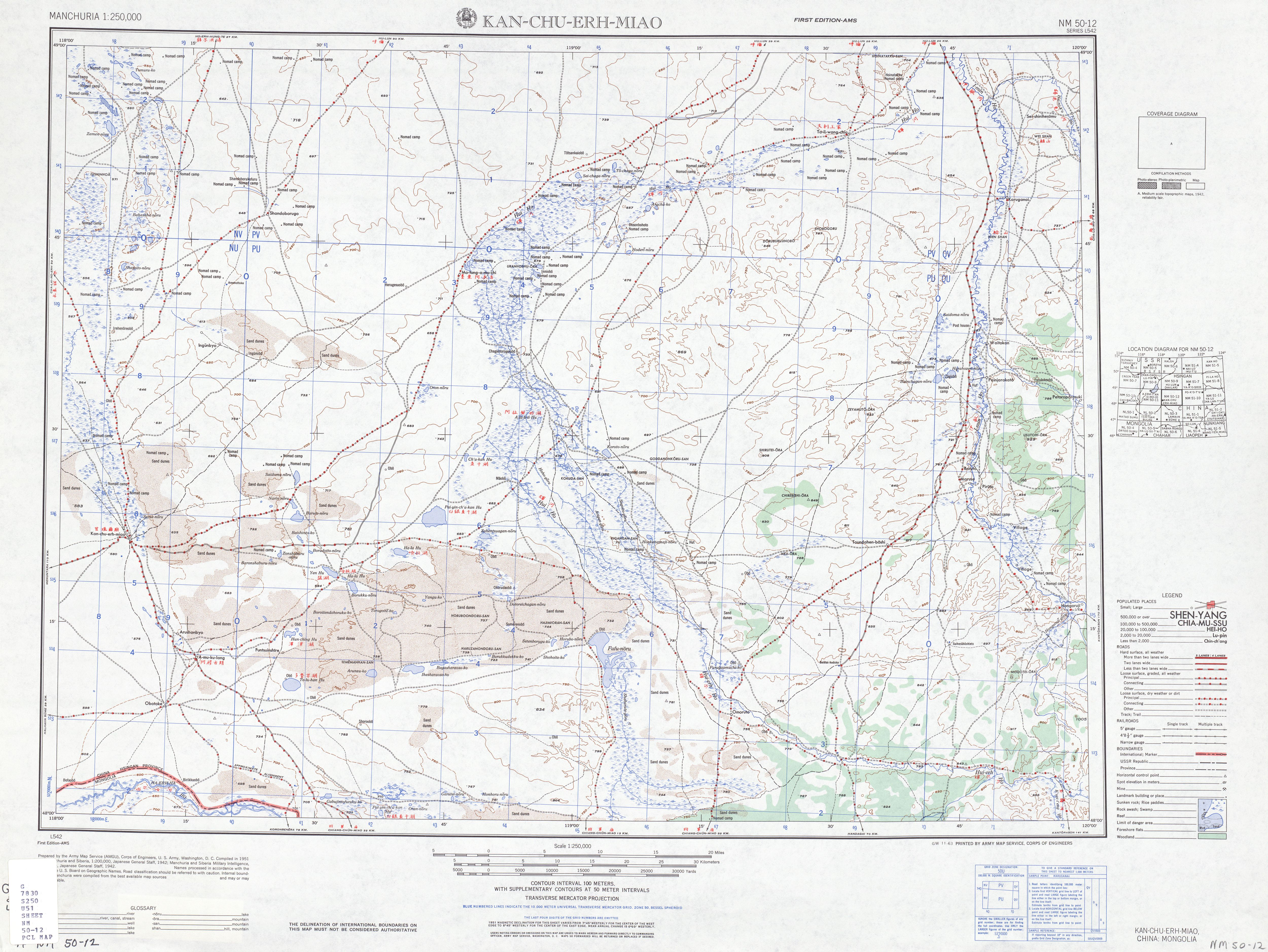
Map including part of modern-day Ewenki Autonomous Banner (AMS, 1951)

The overwhelming majority of the banner's area is grassland, although the banner also includes a sizable amount of woodlands. The banner experiences an average annual precipitation of 315 mm (12.4 in), and an average annual temperature of −2.4 °C (27.7 °F).

Climate data for Ewenki Autonomous Banner, elevation 621 m (2,037 ft), (1991–2020 normals, extremes 1981–2010)
| Month | Jan | Feb | Mar | Apr | May | Jun | Jul | Aug | Sep | Oct | Nov | Dec | Year |
|---|---|---|---|---|---|---|---|---|---|---|---|---|---|
| Record high °C (°F) | −0.7 (30.7) | 4.1 (39.4) | 16.3 (61.3) | 30.0 (86.0) | 34.1 (93.4) | 40.1 (104.2) | 40.1 (104.2) | 37.2 (99.0) | 33.8 (92.8) | 26.8 (80.2) | 13.0 (55.4) | 2.7 (36.9) | 40.1 (104.2) |
| Mean daily maximum °C (°F) | −19.7 (−3.5) | −13.7 (7.3) | −3.2 (26.2) | 9.8 (49.6) | 19.1 (66.4) | 25.2 (77.4) | 27.1 (80.8) | 24.9 (76.8) | 18.4 (65.1) | 8.0 (46.4) | −6.0 (21.2) | −17.0 (1.4) | 6.1 (42.9) |
| Daily mean °C (°F) | −25.6 (−14.1) | −20.7 (−5.3) | −10.2 (13.6) | 3.1 (37.6) | 12.0 (53.6) | 18.5 (65.3) | 21.0 (69.8) | 18.5 (65.3) | 11.2 (52.2) | 1.0 (33.8) | −12.1 (10.2) | −22.4 (−8.3) | −0.5 (31.1) |
| Mean daily minimum °C (°F) | −30.1 (−22.2) | −26.3 (−15.3) | −16.4 (2.5) | −3.3 (26.1) | 4.4 (39.9) | 11.4 (52.5) | 15.2 (59.4) | 12.8 (55.0) | 5.0 (41.0) | −4.4 (24.1) | −16.9 (1.6) | −26.9 (−16.4) | −6.3 (20.7) |
| Record low °C (°F) | −46.5 (−51.7) | −42.6 (−44.7) | −34.0 (−29.2) | −22.4 (−8.3) | −10.9 (12.4) | −0.6 (30.9) | 4.1 (39.4) | 0.5 (32.9) | −8.2 (17.2) | −21.4 (−6.5) | −39.0 (−38.2) | −42.7 (−44.9) | −46.5 (−51.7) |
| Average precipitation mm (inches) | 3.7 (0.15) | 3.5 (0.14) | 5.4 (0.21) | 12.6 (0.50) | 23.6 (0.93) | 51.0 (2.01) | 87.2 (3.43) | 82.2 (3.24) | 35.0 (1.38) | 15.5 (0.61) | 6.1 (0.24) | 6.4 (0.25) | 332.2 (13.09) |
| Average precipitation days (≥ 0.1 mm) | 8.1 | 5.3 | 5.3 | 6.2 | 7.8 | 11.6 | 13.6 | 12.4 | 9.2 | 6.6 | 6.9 | 9.7 | 102.7 |
| Average snowy days | 11.8 | 8.6 | 8.4 | 6.3 | 1.1 | 0.1 | 0 | 0 | 0.5 | 5.5 | 10.4 | 13.7 | 66.4 |
| Average relative humidity (%) | 72 | 72 | 65 | 49 | 44 | 56 | 66 | 68 | 62 | 60 | 70 | 73 | 63 |
| Mean monthly sunshine hours | 178.5 | 211.0 | 269.5 | 264.7 | 289.6 | 295.5 | 292.5 | 279.9 | 248.2 | 220.6 | 178.3 | 153.2 | 2,881.5 |
| Percentage possible sunshine | 66 | 73 | 73 | 64 | 61 | 61 | 60 | 64 | 67 | 67 | 66 | 60 | 65 |
Source: China Meteorological Administration

== Economy ==
A number of local state-run enterprises are located in Ewenki Autonomous Banner, many of which deal with natural resources such as coal and lumber. These enterprises include Huaneng Yimin Coal and Electricity Company, which produces thermal and photovoltaic electricity, Shenhua Dayan Energy Group, and Inner Mongolia Tongda Coal Industry Corporation.

Ewenki Autonomous Banner's gross domestic product totaled 10.69273 billion renminbi (RMB) as of 2019, a 2.3% increase from 2018. Of this, 8.47% came from the autonomous banner's primary sector, 55.16% came from the secondary sector, and 36.37% came from the tertiary sector.

In 2019, households in the autonomous banner earned an average annual disposable income of 33,168 RMB. The autonomous banner's urban households earned an average of 33,214 RMB in disposable income, ranking 58th out of the 101 county-level divisions in Inner Mongolia for which this statistic was reported; and rural households in the autonomous banner earned an average of 24,926 RMB in disposable income, ranking 9th out of the 90 county-level divisions for which this statistic was reported.

Consumer retail sales in the autonomous banner totaled 2.06048 billion RMB as of 2019.

As of 2019, there were 21,204 mobile telephone subscriptions in the Ewenki Autonomous Banner, accounting for 14.50% of its total population, and 29,769 internet subscriptions, accounting for 21.76% of its total population.

In 2019, Ewenki Autonomous Banner earned 736.62 million RMB in public budget revenue, ranking 40th out of the 103 county-level divisions in Inner Mongolia.

=== Agriculture ===
Ewenki Autonomous Banner produced 49,145 tons of grain in 2019, ranking 71st out of the 96 county-level divisions in Inner Mongolia which for which this statistic was reported. In the same year, the autonomous banner produced 17,749 tons of meat, ranking 57th out of Inner Mongolia's 103 county-level divisions.

== Demographics ==
As of 2019, the autonomous banner's population of 136,832 ranks 71st out of Inner Mongolia's 103 county-level divisions. This total was a 0.7% decline from the previous year.

=== Ethnicity ===
The autonomous banner's government reported in 2013 that ethnic minorities within the banner totaled 58,843 people, accounting for 40.8% of the total population. In addition to the Han Chinese majority in the autonomous banner, sizable minority communities include the Evenki, Mongol, Daur, Manchu, Hui, Korean, Oroqen, and Sibe people.

| Ethnicity | Population | Percentage |
|---|---|---|
| Han Chinese | ~85,157 | 59.2% |
| Mongol | 27,809 | 19.3% |
| Daur | 14,239 | 9.9% |
| Evenki | 11,193 | 7.8% |
| Others | ~5,602 | 3.8% |

== Education ==
The autonomous banner has 10 primary schools and 11 secondary schools.

== Healthcare ==
As of 2019, Ewenki Autonomous Banner's medical institutions host 604 beds, and are staffed by 1,100 personnel.

== Transport ==
Ewenki Autonomous Banner is served by 1,422 kilometres (884 mi) of highway as of 2019.

Dayan is crossed by the Hailar–Imin Railway, the Harbin-Manzhouli railway, and highways G301 and G10. Hailar International Airport is the nearest airport.

== Gallery ==
Dayan Town

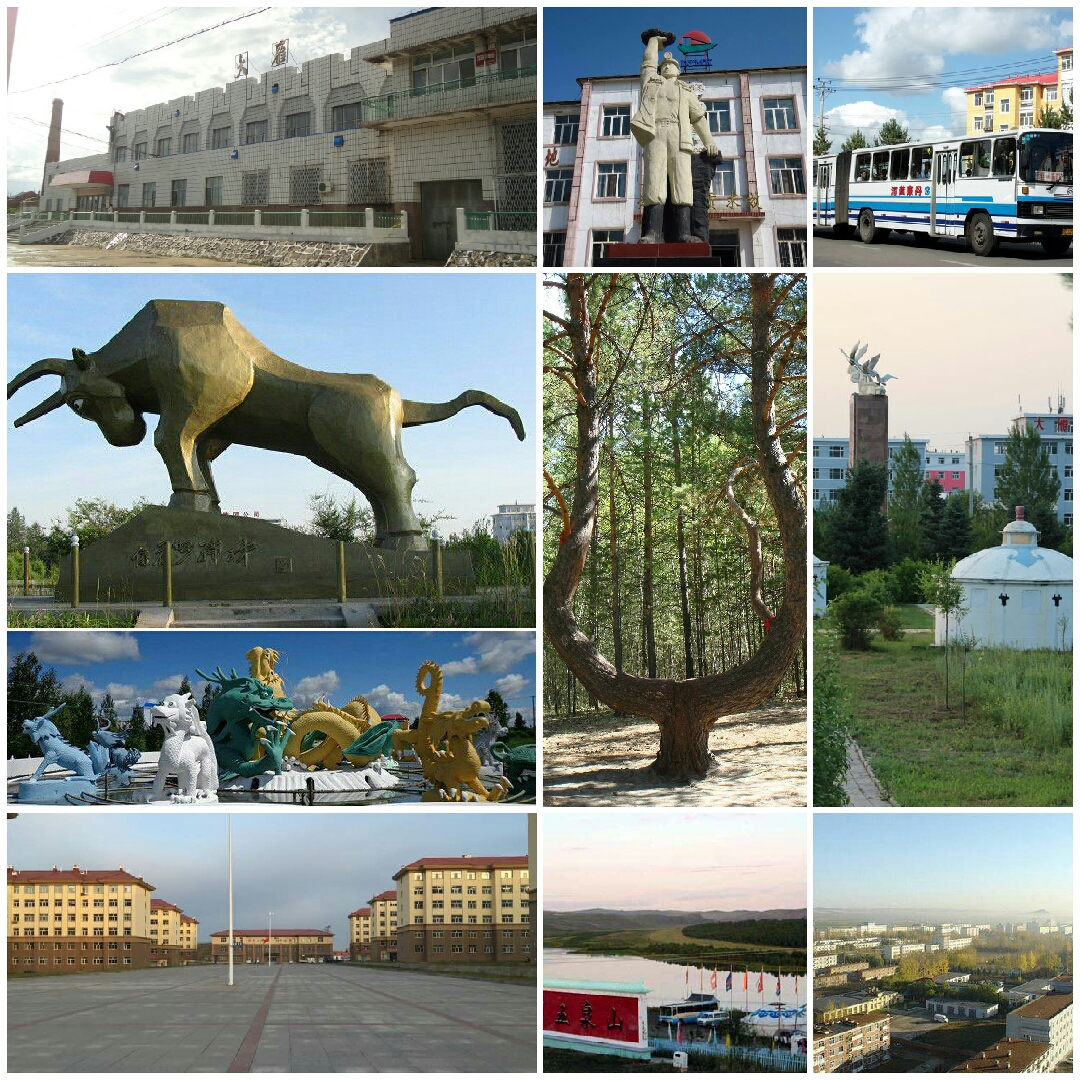
Places in Dayan

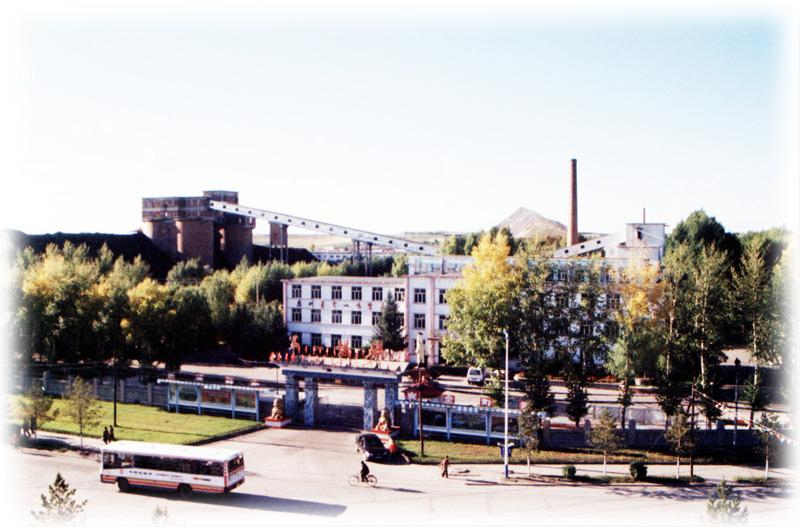
No.1 Colliery of Dayan in 1990s

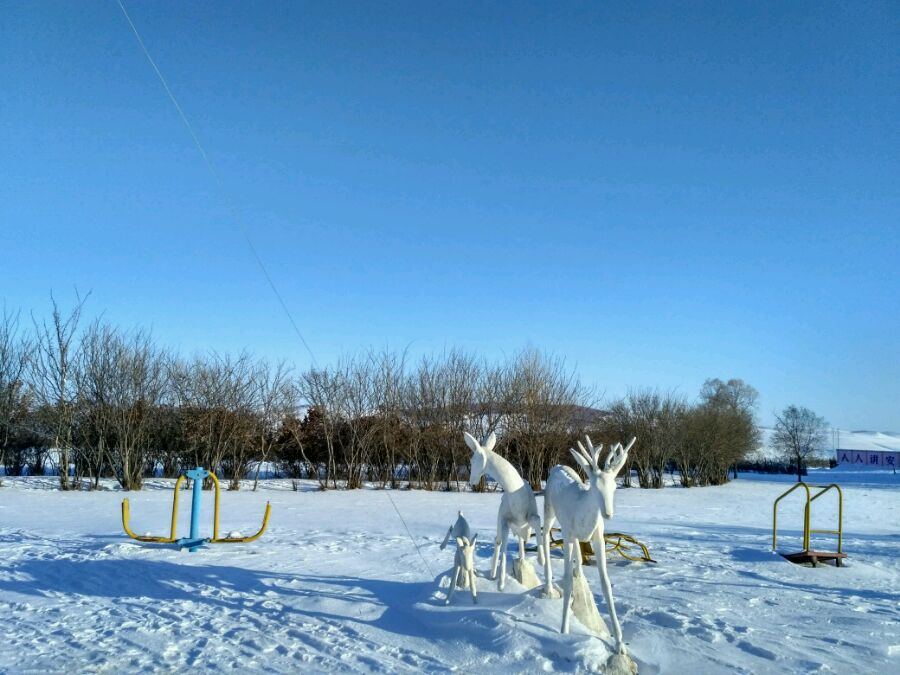
Winter of Dayan
The other Administrative Divisions in Evenk Banner

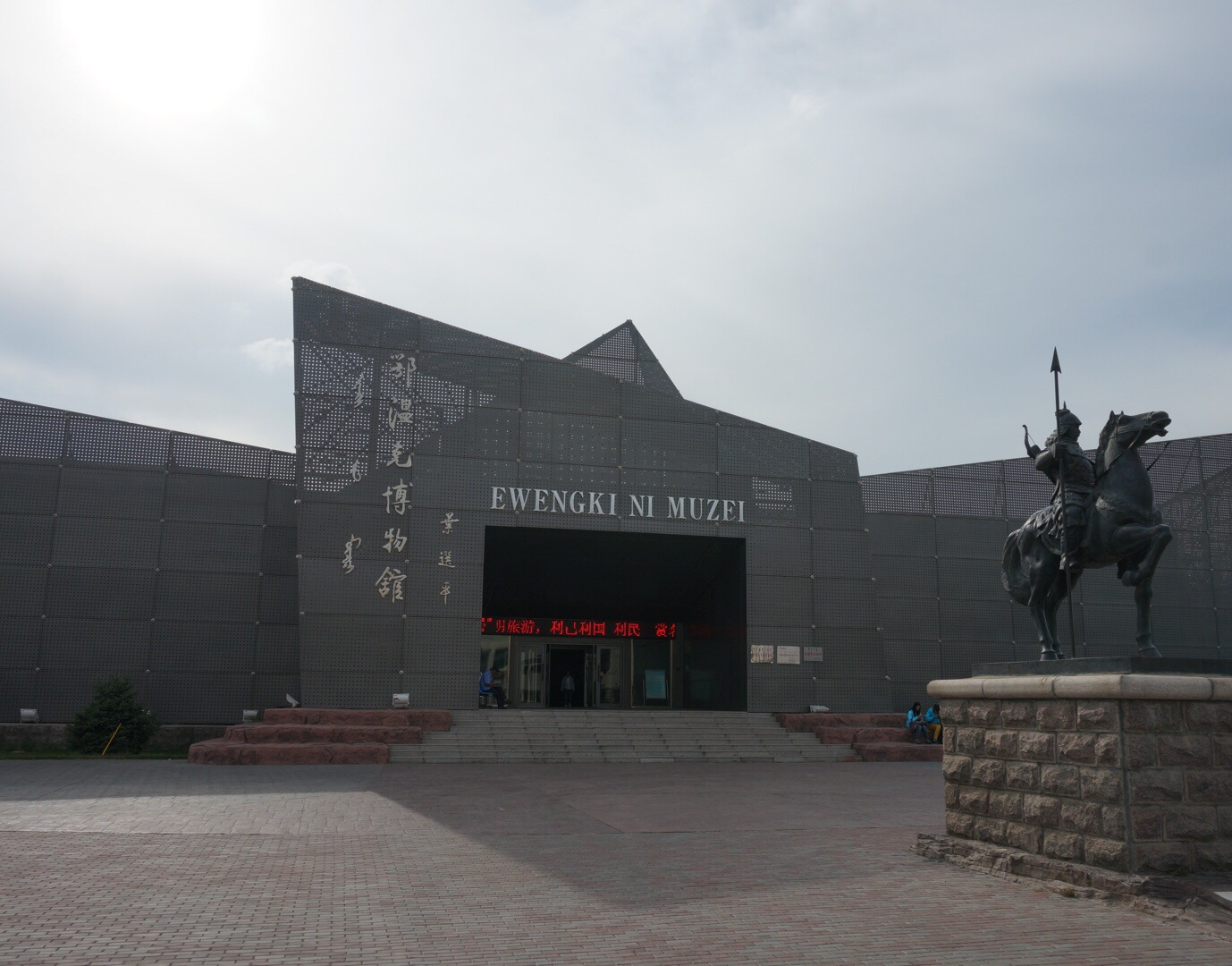
Ewenki Museum in the town of Bayan Tohoi

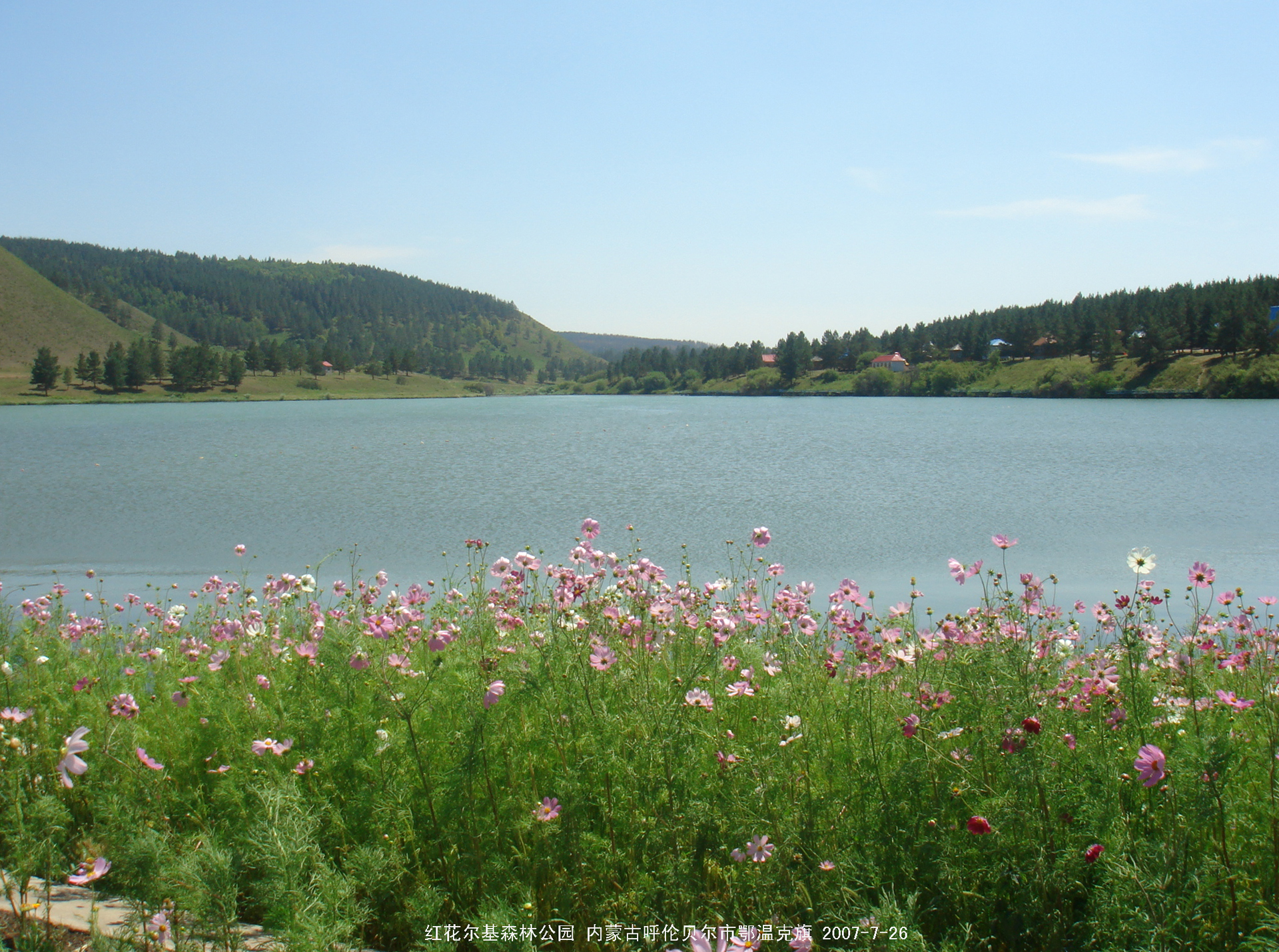
Hongholji National Forest Park

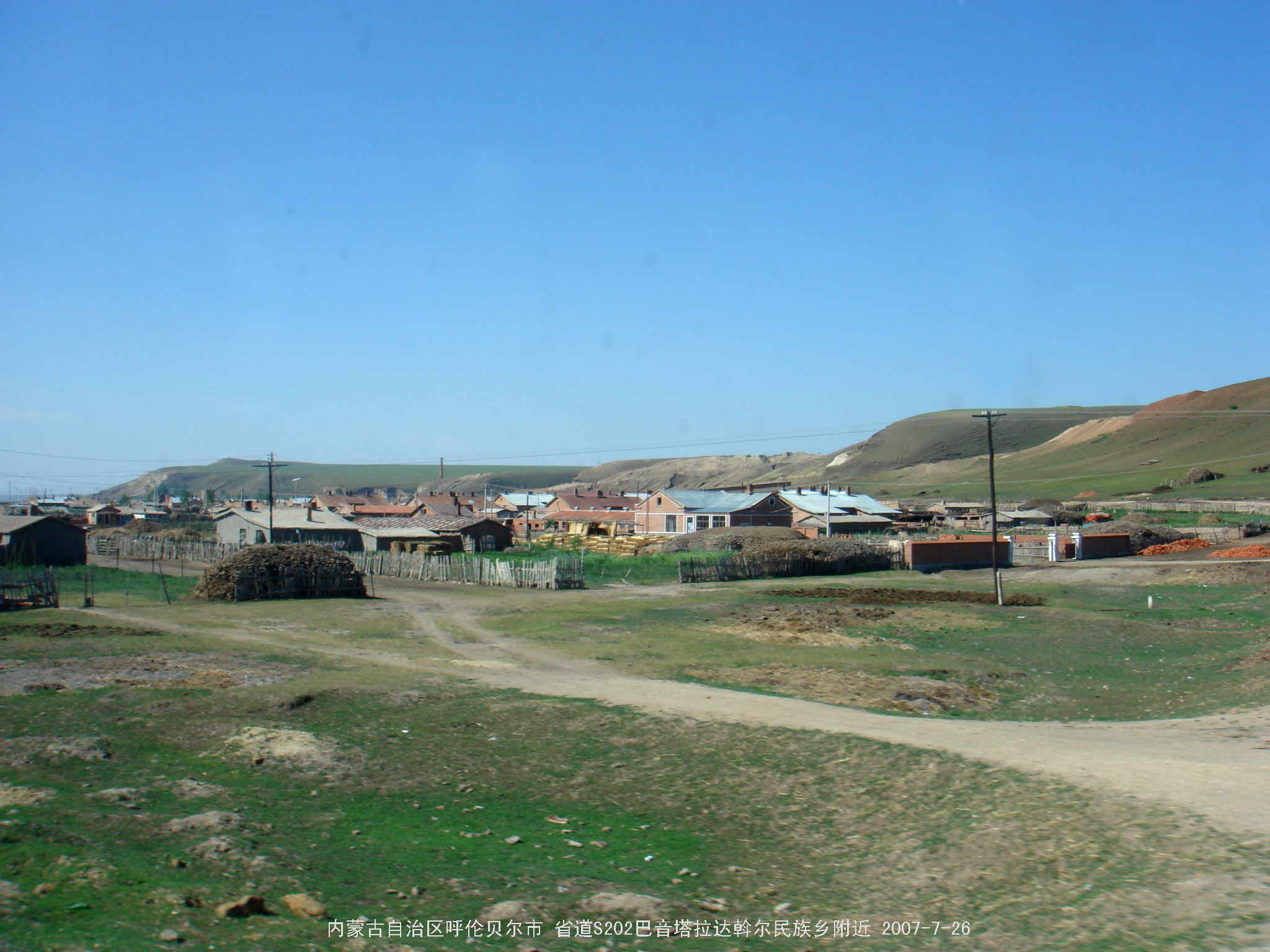
Bayantal Daur Ethnic Township
