= Tunguska event =

1908 air burst explosion in Siberia, Russia

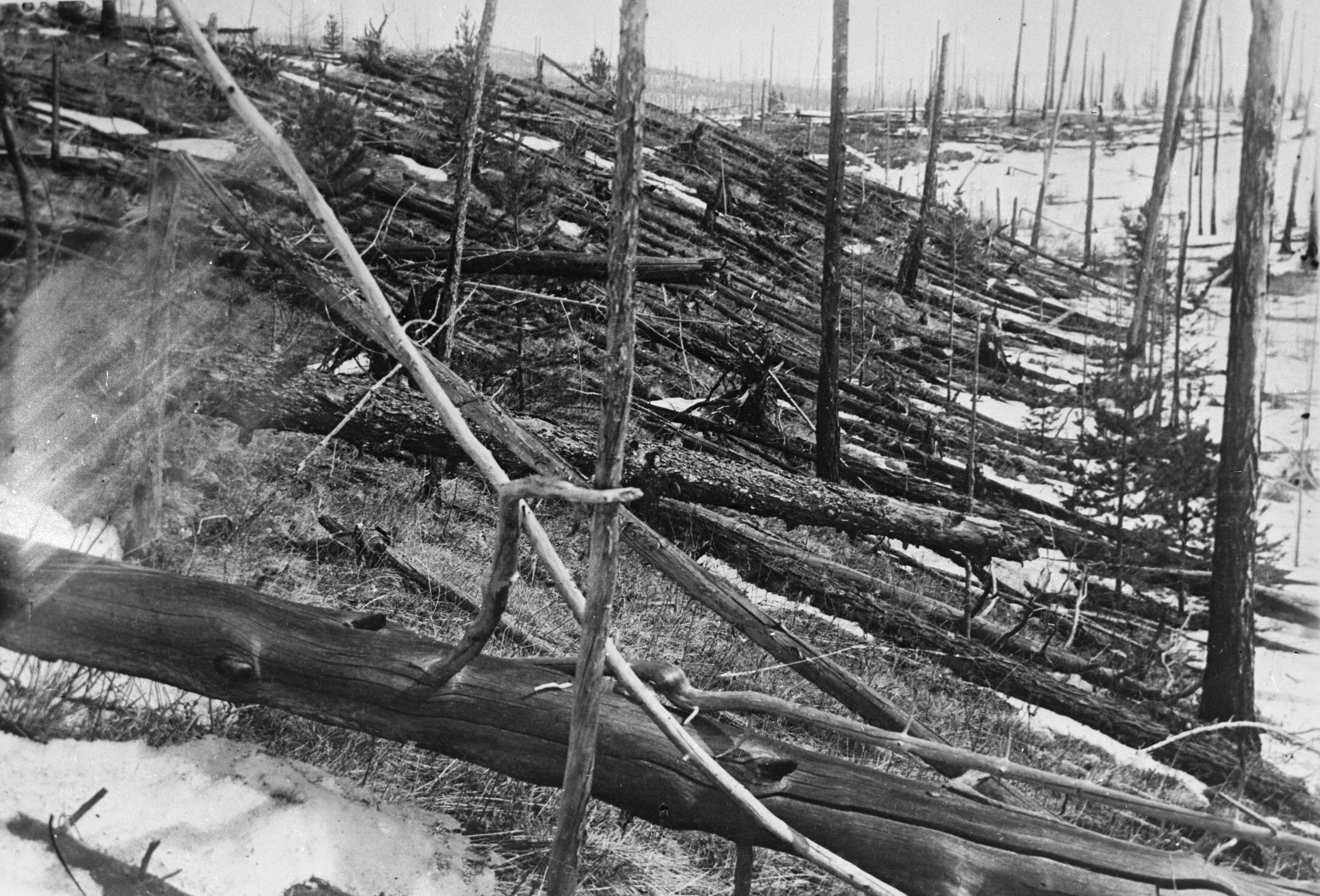
- Trees knocked down and burned by the blast, photographed in May 1929 by Yevgeny Krinov during Leonid Kulik's third expedition to the epicenter.
- Date: 30 June [O.S. 17 June] 1908
- Time: 07:14 (UTC+7)
- Location: Podkamennaya Tunguska River, Yeniseysk Governorate, Russian Empire (now Evenkiysky District, Krasnoyarsk Krai); 60°54′11″N 101°54′35″E
- Cause: Probable meteor air burst of small asteroid or comet
- Outcome: Flattened 2,150 km^{2} (830 sq mi) of forest Devastation to local plants and animals
- Deaths: At least three
- Property damage: A few damaged buildings

The Tunguska event was a large explosion that occurred on the morning of 30 June [O.S. 17 June] 1908, at around 7:14 KRAT (0:14 UT) in Central Siberia, then part of the Russian Empire. The cataclysm occurred in a remote and sparsely populated region of the taiga, near the Podkamennaya Tunguska River after which it is named. The shock wave knocked several witnesses to the ground, killed at least three people as well as numerous animals, and shattered windows within a 200 km (120 mi) radius. The blast was recorded by various Russian and German seismological stations with a magnitude close to 5 on the Richter scale, while atmospheric waves generated by the shock wave were detected worldwide. From 30 June to 3 July, intense bright nights were observed across western Eurasia over an area of about 12,000,000 km^{2} (4,600,000 sq mi). Although the Siberian press and various correspondents reported the blast in the following days, it was not until 1921 that a first scientific expedition was organized under the direction of Leonid Kulik, who discovered the site of the epicenter only in 1927.

Kulik and his successors' research revealed that the explosion devastated nearly 2,150 km^{2} (830 sq mi) of forest in a radial pattern which implied an aerial origin. The scientific consensus thus attributes this event to a meteor air burst, the atmospheric explosion of a celestial body, although no fragment has been formally identified. By cross-referencing eyewitness accounts and physical modeling, researchers favor the hypothesis of a 50–60 m (160–200 ft) diameter meteoroid moving at high speed from the south-east. The object would have exploded between 5–10 km (3.1–6.2 mi) in altitude, releasing an energy often estimated between 10 and 15 megatons of TNT, which is enough to destroy an entire major city. This interpretation is reinforced by data collected since the passage of the Chelyabinsk meteor in 2013, whose dynamics were similar. The Tunguska event thus constitutes both the most violent impact event on Earth recorded in modern times and one of the most powerful explosions ever documented. However, the exact nature of the object—that is, whether it was an asteroid or a comet—is still debated. Alternative, terrestrial hypotheses, such as the release of explosive underground gas, have also been suggested, though they remain marginal among the scientific community.

Lake Cheko, located approximately 8 km (5.0 mi) northeast of the epicenter and unrecorded before 1908, may be an impact crater formed by a secondary fragment of the celestial body that detached before its explosion. While its atypical shape and its orientation along the trajectory axis support this hypothesis, several sedimentary studies support a contrary conclusion. A 2019 study suggested that the explosion may have decimated the breeding population of the Sushkin's goose, contributing to its extinction in the following years. The incident remains the primary historical benchmark for assessing risks associated with near-Earth objects as well as for developing planetary defense strategies, and the explosion site is now protected in a nature reserve. The event is frequently depicted in works of fiction, particularly science fiction, through a wide variety of interpretations.

== Background ==
Hungarian map of the Podkamennaya Tunguska basin, the river after which the event was named. The epicenter, not shown on the map, is located about 60 km (37 mi) north of Vanavara.

The Tunguska event occurred in a remote and sparsely populated region of Central Siberia. It is named after the nearby Podkamennaya Tunguska, one of the main tributaries of the Yenisei River. Characterized by a taiga environment resting by permafrost, the area features gently undulating terrain with an elevation change of about 100 m (330 ft), where marshy lowlands alternate with wooded hills. The area is bounded by the Kimchu River to the north and the Khushma River to the south, the former feeding Lake Cheko. Within this boundary lie two large wetlands called the Northern and the Southern Swamp. The taiga's wetlands are divided between deep, impassable marshy tracts (sometimes reaching depths of up to 25 m (82 ft)) and firmer, raised peat mounds, which are colonized by lichens and sparse trees. Subject to a harsh climate, the site remains frozen for eight to nine months a year.

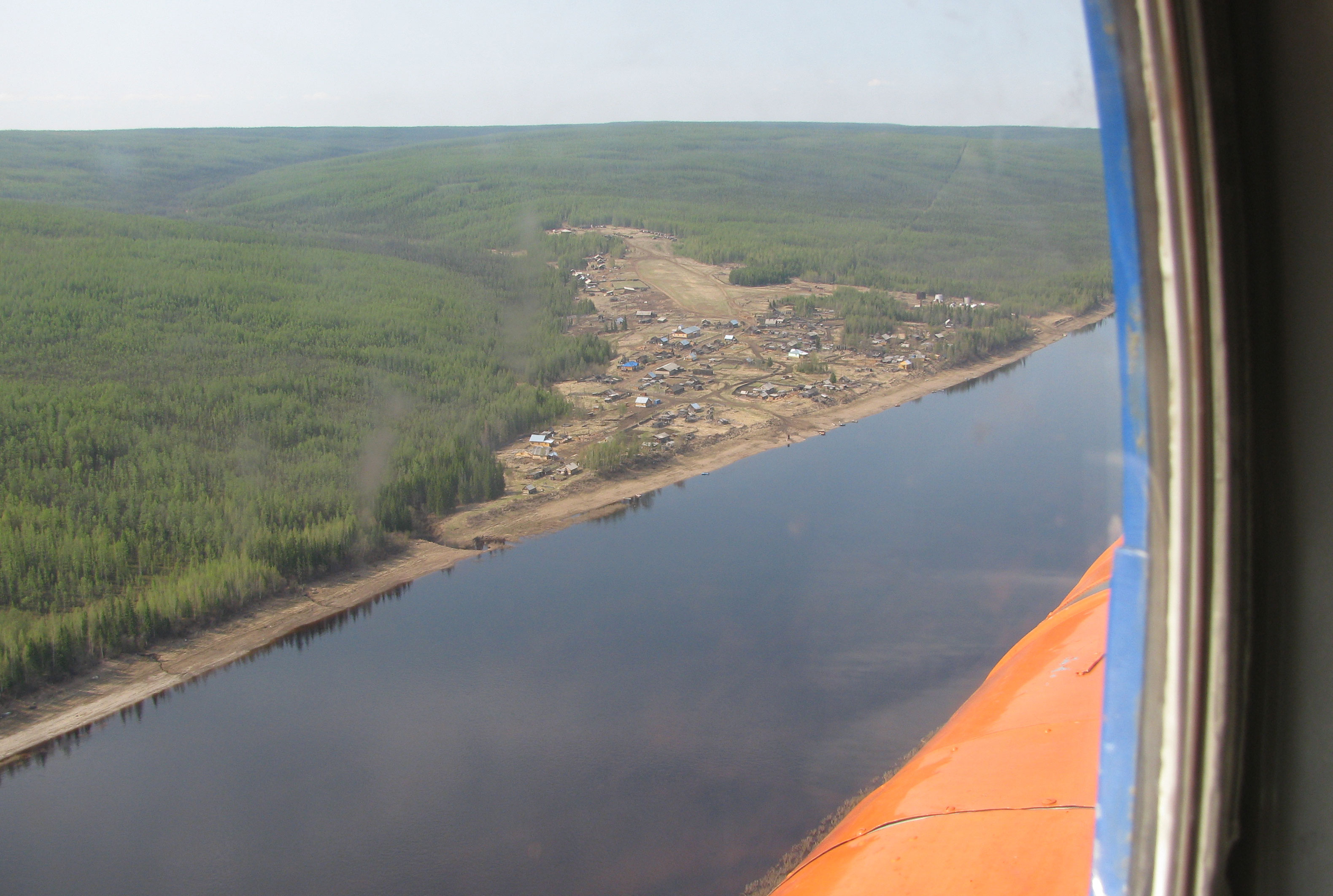
The Podkamennaya Tunguska flowing past the village of Osharovo, a settlement located about 200 km (120 mi) from the explosion site.

Geologically, the area lies at the heart of the Siberian Traps. The epicenter of the explosion is located near the Kulikovsky paleovolcanic complex, dating from the Early Triassic (around 250 million years ago). These same traps are associated with the Permian–Triassic extinction event, considered the most devastating biological crisis in the history of life on Earth. In particular, it led to the extinction of emblematic prehistoric animals of Russia, such as Inostrancevia and Scutosaurus. At the center of the paleovolcano lies Mount Stoikovich, which is the solidified plug of an ancient volcanic pipe. This feature is surrounded by the Great Central Swamp, itself bounded by the rim of the ancient crater where Mount Farrington rises. As the primary landmark of the region, the latter helps pinpoint the exact epicenter of the explosion, located about 3 km (1.9 mi) southwest of its summit.

In 1908, the affected area was located in the Yeniseysk Governorate, an administrative division of the Russian Empire corresponding to the present-day Evenkiysky District of Krasnoyarsk Krai, which is populated predominantly by the Evenks. They generally lived in small, scattered family groups, residing in conical tents called chums, and made a livelihood of reindeer herding, hunting, and fishing. Under the reign of Tsar Nicholas II, fur taxes (yasak) were levied on the Evenks through their traditional clan organizations. Alongside this nomadic population, Russian farmers and traders—present in Siberia since the 17th-century expansion—had established small villages along the rivers, notably Vanavara, located about 60 km (37 mi) south of the epicenter. Gold mines were being worked along the Yenisei River, while the Trans-Siberian Railway had reached Lake Baikal as early as 1898, bringing with it a large influx of peasant settlers from the western parts of the country. Academics exiled for their participation in the 1905 revolution were also present. Finally, the empire was still marked by the very recent Russo-Japanese War.

== Disaster ==
French map showing the location and epicenter of the event. In red: flattened taiga (radius of r = 20 km (12 mi)); in orange: severe damage (r = 100 km (62 mi)); in blue gradient: observed bolide and explosion heard (r = 1,500 km (930 mi)).

On the morning of Tuesday, 30 June [O.S. 17 June] 1908, (Note: At the time, the Russian Empire used the Julian calendar, and the event was thus dated to 17 June 1908. Following the adoption of the Gregorian calendar in Russia on 14 February 1918, this same date corresponds to 30 June 1908 in the new calendar.) a bolide, described by several witnesses as having a brightness and apparent size greater than that of the Sun, traversed Earth's atmosphere over a distance of at least 1,000 kilometres (620 mi). Moving from south-east to north-west while leaving a thin white trail, the object was seen across Central Siberia from a distance of up to 600 to 1,500 kilometres (370 to 930 mi), observation being further facilitated by a perfectly clear sky that day. At around 7:14 KRAT (0:14 UT), a powerful and deafening explosion was heard over the taiga in the Podkamennaya Tunguska basin. The blast was accompanied by an intense reddish glow, compared by some observers to a "sparkling broom", while generating a column of fire and a cloud of smoke rising tens of kilometers into the air.

The explosion occurred directly above the Southern swamp and devastated the taiga, flattening several million trees over an area of more than 2,150 km^{2} (830 sq mi), while decimating numerous reindeer and dogs belonging to the Evenks. Under the effect of the shock wave, the trees were felled in a radial pattern forming the characteristic shape of two "butterfly wings" around the central area. At the epicenter itself, the blast stripped the trees of their branches but left them standing, forming a unique zone at the heart of the flattened forest. The initial thermal pulse simultaneously ignited several sporadic fires, with its heat felt up to about 80 kilometres (50 mi) from the epicenter. Perceived over 800 kilometres (500 mi) away, the shock wave spread over hundreds of kilometers and shattered windows within a radius of nearly 200 kilometres (120 mi). At similar distances, the tremors knocked people down or threw them to the ground.

The explosion was recorded by seismological stations in three cities in the Russian Empire—Irkutsk, Tashkent, and Tiflis—as well as by a station in Jena in the German Empire. However, the records from the Russian cities were first published in 1910 by geophysicist Grigori Levitski, while those from Jena were published three years later; it was not until 1925 that a paper formally linked these data to the Tunguska event. Since the Richter scale was not proposed until 1935, it was not until the late 20th century that the shock wave generated by the explosion was determined to be equivalent to a seismic magnitude near 5. Atmospheric waves generated by the blast were also detected by barographs across the world, but their connection to the 1908 event was only established in the 1930s. Among the stations involved were those in Berlin, Potsdam, and on the Schneekoppe in the German Empire, as well as in London, England, and Zagreb, Croatia. Changes in atmospheric pressure were also recorded thousands of kilometers from the explosion, notably as far as Batavia in the Dutch East Indies (now Indonesia) and Washington, D.C., in the United States.

In the days following the explosion, western Eurasia experienced unusual atmospheric phenomena. On the evening of 30 June, bright nights of rare intensity were reported across an area of about 12,000,000 km^{2} (4,600,000 sq mi), to the extent that it became possible to read a newspaper or photograph monuments around midnight without artificial lighting. The sky displayed various hues, described as white, pink, red, golden, yellow-orange, or green, although some of these colors likely corresponded to the usual shades of a sunset. Most of these observations were reported in various newspapers, such as the British daily The Times, from 2 to 4 July 1908. The phenomenon extended south as far as Bordeaux, France, and Tashkent, and north to Aberdeen, Scotland, and Stockholm, Sweden. In several communications published in Nature, astronomers—including William F. Denning regarding the night of 30 June in Bristol, England—reported having to abandon their astronomical observations due to the unusual brightness of the sky. While the bright nights faded in two or three days, luminous halos persisted for about ten days longer, and these twilight anomalies remained perceptible until the end of the summer of 1908.

== Injuries, loss and eyewitnesses ==
Between 1908 and the 1970s, more than 700 eyewitness accounts describing the event were collected. However, the more recent accounts have lower scientific value, as time degrades memory and alters factual accuracy. Despite the low population density around the epicenter, the event caused an unknown number of injuries. In the tree fall zone, at least thirty people were exposed to the blast effects, and several lost consciousness for periods ranging from a few hours to several days. These losses of consciousness occurred notably due to the shock wave, fear, or stress. In some cases, they coincided with the arrival of the air burst, suggesting a form of concussion. Others may have lost consciousness due to smoke inhalation, the presence of burning materials nearby, or the emotional shock caused by the event. Nevertheless, the Evenks present in the blast area were generally inside their chums at the time of the explosion, which notably limited their exposure to burns. Furthermore, no injuries caused by shattered glass were reported, despite windows being broken hundreds of kilometers from the epicenter.

One of the most famous eyewitness accounts of the event comes from Semyon B. Semyonov, a farmer from Vanavara, who gave his account in a letter written in 1930:

I don't remember the year exactly, but more than twenty years ago when the fallow land was being ploughed up I was sitting in the porch of the house at the trading station of Vanovara at breakfast time and looking towards the north. I had just raised my axe to hoop a cask when suddenly in the north above Vasily Il'yich Onkoul's Tunguska Road, the sky was split in two, and high above the forest the whole northern part of the sky appeared to be covered with fire. At that moment I felt great heat as if my shirt had caught fire; this heat came from the north side. I wanted to pull off my shirt and throw it away, but at that moment there was a bang in the sky, and a mighty crash was heard. I was thrown on to the ground about three sajenes [around six meters] away from the porch and for a moment I lost consciousness. My wife ran out and carried me into the hut. The crash was followed by noise like stones falling from the sky, or guns firing. The earth trembled, and when I lay on the ground I covered my head because I was afraid that stones might hit it. At the moment when the sky opened, a hot wind, as from a cannon, blew past the huts from the north. It left its mark on the ground in the form of little paths, and damaged onion plants. Later, it turned out that many panes in the windows had been blown out, and the iron hasp in the door of the barn had been broken.

Another famous and frequently cited account is that of Chuchan (whose Russian name was Stepan Ivanovich, family name unknown), an Evenk from the Shanyagyr clan. Recorded in an account written in 1926, his testimony indicates that he was then located further north, at the very heart of the area where trees were felled by air bust:

Our tent was then standing on the bank of the Avarkitta River. Before sunrise, Chekaren and I returned from the Dilyushma River, where we had been visiting Ivan and Akulina. We were sleeping. Suddenly we both woke up at once: something was pushing us. We heard a whistling sound and felt a strong wind. Chekaren even shouted to me: "Do you hear how many goldeneyes or mergansers are flying?" We were still inside the tent and couldn't see what was happening in the forest. Suddenly something pushed me again, so hard that I hit my head against a tent pole and fell onto the hot embers in the hearth. I was frightened. Chekaren was frightened too and grabbed a pole. We started calling for our father, mother, and brother, but no one answered. Outside the tent there was some noise; we could hear trees falling. Chekaren and I crawled out of our sleeping bags and were about to rush out of the tent, but suddenly thunder struck very loudly. That was the first stroke. The earth began to twitch and sway; a strong wind hit our tent and knocked it down. I was pinned down tightly by the poles, but my head was uncovered because the tent cover was pulled up. Then I saw a terrible wonder: trees were falling, their needles were burning, dry wood on the ground was burning, reindeer moss was burning. Smoke was all around, my eyes hurt, it was hot, very hot, enough to burn alive. Suddenly above the mountain, where the forest had already fallen, it became very bright, and, how should I put it, as if a second sun appeared—Russians would say it suddenly flashed unexpectedly—my eyes hurt and I even closed them. It looked like what Russians call lightning. And immediately there was a loud thunderclap, strong thunder. That was the second stroke. The morning was sunny, there were no clouds, our sun was shining brightly as always, and here a second sun appeared! With difficulty, Chekaren and I crawled out from under the poles and the tent cover. After that, we saw another flash above, but in a different place, and there was loud thunder again. That was the third stroke. A wind swept over us, knocked us off our feet, and slammed us against a fallen tree. We watched the falling trees, saw how their tops broke, and looked at the fire. Suddenly Chekaren shouted: "Look up!" and pointed with his hand. I looked there and saw lightning again; it flashed and struck again, making a loud thunderclap. But the noise was a little less than before. That was the fourth stroke, like ordinary thunder. Now I remember well that there was one more stroke, a fifth one, but it was small and somewhere far away.

At least three people died during the event. The identified fatalities were three Evenks: Ivan Machakugyr, Lurbuman, and the shaman Uiban. Thrown nearly 40 metres (130 ft) against a tree by the shock wave, Machakugyr suffered an open fracture of his arm, which led to a fatal infection. Lurbuman died immediately from neurological distress and extreme emotional shock caused by the violence of the explosion. As for the shaman Uiban, he died under uncertain circumstances further from the epicenter, likely falling victim to one of the wildfires ignited by the blast. Due to the extraordinary and dramatic nature of the event, eyewitnesses offered varying interpretations. Upon seeing the bolide, several people interpreted it as another planet colliding with Earth, bringing about the end of the world. Many Evenks, practitioners of Siberian shamanism, attributed the Tunguska event to the wrath of Ogdy, the god of fire and lightning in their mythology, who had come to punish them for their disobedience. Furthermore, according to customs of the era, the Evenks often buried their dead at the exact location of death and subsequently avoided returning to those burial sites. Because the disaster resulted in at least three confirmed deaths, many Evenks were reluctant to discuss the event, which explains the scarcity of their accounts detailing injuries and human losses. Among the Eastern Orthodox inhabitants, some believed the End times had arrived and prepared for the Apocalypse, even donning their burial garments.

== Scientific investigation ==
Since the 1908 event, an estimated 1,000 scholarly papers (most in Russian) have been published about the Tunguska explosion. Owing to the site's remoteness and the limited instrumentation available at the time of the event, modern scientific interpretations of its cause and magnitude have relied chiefly on damage assessments and geological studies conducted many years after the event. Estimates of its energy have ranged from 3–30 megatons of TNT (13–126 PJ).

Not until more than a decade after the event did any scientific analysis of the region take place, in part due to the area's isolation and significant political upheaval affecting Russia in the 1910s. In 1921, the Russian mineralogist Leonid Kulik led a team to the Podkamennaya Tunguska River basin to conduct a survey for the Soviet Academy of Sciences. Although they never visited the central blast area, the many local accounts of the event led Kulik to believe that a giant meteorite impact had caused the event. Upon returning, he persuaded the Soviet government to fund an expedition to the suspected impact zone, based on the prospect of salvaging meteoric iron.

Kulik led a scientific expedition to the Tunguska blast site in 1927. He hired local Evenki hunters to guide his team to the centre of the blast area, where they expected to find an impact crater. To their surprise, there was no crater at ground zero. Instead, they found a zone, roughly 8 km (5.0 mi) across, where the trees were scorched and devoid of branches, but still standing upright. Trees farther from the centre had been partly scorched and knocked down away from the centre, creating a large radial pattern of downed trees.

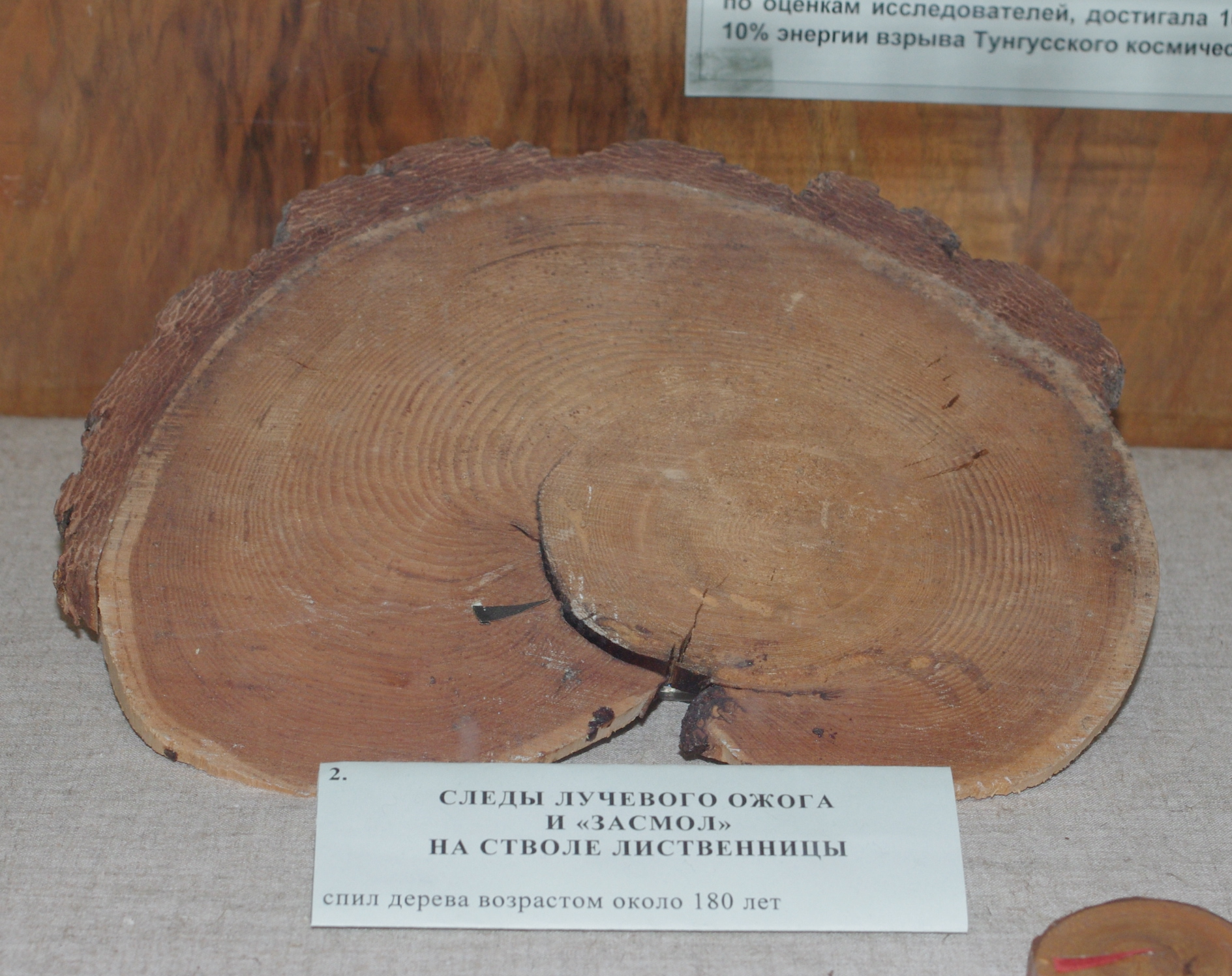
Sample of burn damaged tree, museum of Moscow State University

In the 1960s, it was established that the zone of levelled forest occupied an area of 2,150 km^{2} (830 sq mi), its shape resembling a gigantic spread-eagled butterfly with a "wingspan" of 70 km (43 mi) and a "body length" of 55 km (34 mi). Upon closer examination, Kulik found holes that he erroneously concluded were meteorite holes; he did not have the means at that time to excavate the holes.

During the next 10 years, there were three more expeditions to the area. Kulik found several dozen little "pothole" bogs, each 10–50 m (33–164 ft) in diameter, that he thought might be meteoric craters. After a laborious exercise in draining one of these bogs—the so-called "Suslov's crater" of 32 m (105 ft) in diameter—he found an old tree stump on the bottom, ruling out the possibility that it was a meteoric crater. In 1938, Kulik arranged for an aerial photographic survey of the area, covering the 250 km^{2} (95 sq mi) central part of the levelled forest. The original negatives of these aerial photographs—1,500 negatives, each 18 by 18 cm (7.1 by 7.1 in)—were burned in 1975 by order of Yevgeny Krinov, then Chairman of the Committee on Meteorites of the USSR Academy of Sciences, as part of an initiative to dispose of increasingly flammable nitrate film. Positive prints were preserved for further study in Tomsk.

Expeditions sent to the area in the 1950s and 1960s found microscopic silicate and magnetite spheres in siftings of the soil. Similar spheres were predicted to exist in the felled trees, although they could not be detected by contemporary means. Later expeditions did identify such spheres in the resin of the trees. Chemical analysis showed that the spheres contained high proportions of nickel relative to iron, which is also found in meteorites, leading to the conclusion they were of extraterrestrial origin. The concentration of the spheres in different regions of the soil was also found to be consistent with the expected distribution of debris from a meteor air burst. Later studies of the spheres found unusual ratios of numerous other metals relative to the surrounding environment, which was taken as further evidence of their extraterrestrial origin.

Chemical analysis of peat bogs from the area also revealed numerous anomalies considered consistent with an impact event. The isotopic signatures of carbon, hydrogen, and nitrogen at the layer of the bogs corresponding to 1908 were found to be inconsistent with the isotopic ratios measured in the adjacent layers, and this abnormality was not found in bogs outside the area. The region of the bogs showing these anomalous signatures also contains an unusually high proportion of iridium, similar to the iridium layer found in the Cretaceous–Paleogene boundary. These unusual proportions are believed to result from debris from the falling body that deposited in the bogs. The nitrogen is believed to have been deposited as acid rain, a suspected fallout from the explosion.

Other scientists disagree: "Some papers report that hydrogen, carbon and nitrogen isotopic compositions with signatures similar to those of CI and CM carbonaceous chondrites were found in Tunguska peat layers dating from the TE, and that iridium anomalies were also observed. Measurements performed in other laboratories have not confirmed these results."

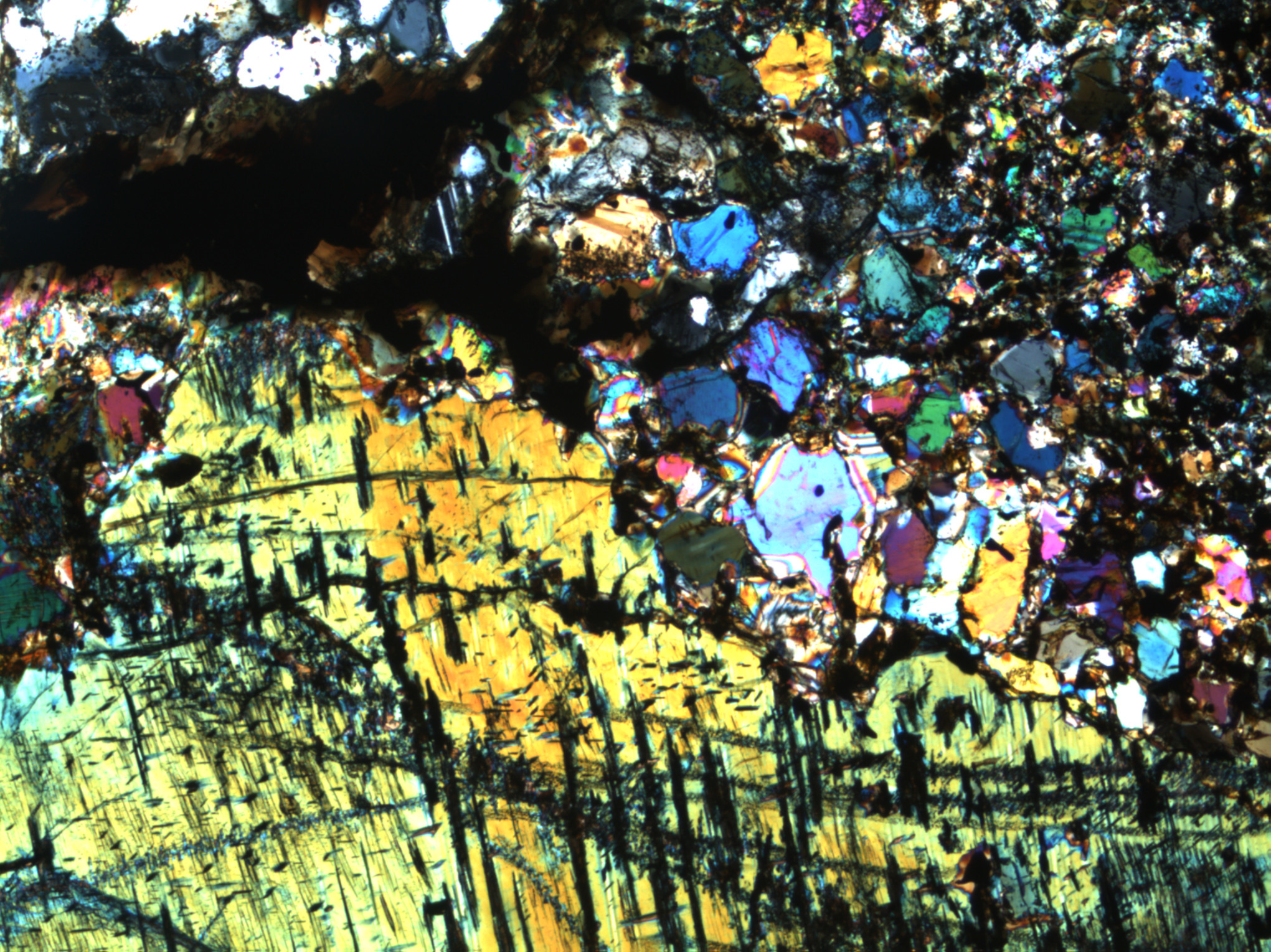
Thin section of a fragment of "John's stone" from the epicentre of the Tunguska event. "John's stone" was suspected of being a Tunguska meteorite fragment, but is in fact a metamorphic, terrestrial rock.

Researcher John Anfinogenov has suggested that a boulder found at the event site, known as "John's stone", is a remnant of the meteorite, but oxygen isotope analysis of the quartzite suggests that it is of hydrothermal origin, and probably related to Permian-Triassic Siberian Traps magmatism.

In 2013, a team of researchers published the results of an analysis of micro-samples from a peat bog near the centre of the affected area, which show fragments that may be of extraterrestrial origin.

The observations of decreased atmospheric transparency at the Mount Wilson Observatory in California have been used to calculate that roughly a million tons of dust were released into the stratosphere. Further modelling suggests that shock waves from the falling meteor generated up to 30 Mt of nitric oxide (NO) in the stratosphere and mesosphere which resulted in a peak ozone depletion of 35-45% for early 1909, and ones of ~30% in 1910, and ~15% in 1911, and a tripling of UV-B intensity at the ground at latitude 30°N.

=== Earth impactor model ===
The leading scientific explanation for the explosion is a meteor air burst by an asteroid 6–10 km (4–6 mi) above the Earth's surface. Meteoroids enter Earth's atmosphere from outer space every day, travelling at a speed of at least 11 km/s (40,000 km/h; 25,000 mph), the escape velocity of the Earth. The heat generated by compression of air in front of the body (ram pressure) as it travels through the atmosphere is immense and most meteoroids burn up or explode before they reach the ground. Early estimates of the energy of the Tunguska air burst ranged from 10–15 to 30 megatons of TNT (42–63 to 126 PJ), depending on the exact height of the burst as estimated when the scaling laws from the effects of nuclear weapons are employed.

More recent calculations that include the effect of the object's momentum find that more of the energy was focused downward than would be the case from a nuclear explosion and estimate that the air burst had an energy range of 3–5 Mt (13–21 PJ). The 15-megaton (Mt) estimate represents an energy about 1,000 times greater than that of the Trinity nuclear test, and roughly equal to that of the United States' Castle Bravo nuclear test in 1954 (which measured 15.2 Mt) and one third that of the Soviet Union's Tsar Bomba test in 1961. A 2019 paper suggests the explosive power of the Tunguska event may have been around 20–30 Mt.

Since the second half of the 20th century, close monitoring of Earth's atmosphere through infrasound and satellite observation has shown that asteroid air bursts with energies comparable to those of nuclear weapons routinely occur, although Tunguska-sized events, on the order of 5–15 Mt, are much rarer. Eugene Shoemaker estimated that 20 kt events occur annually and that Tunguska-sized events occur about once every 300 years. More recent estimates place Tunguska-sized events at about once every thousand years, with five-kiloton air bursts averaging about once per year. Most of these are thought to be caused by asteroid impactors, as opposed to mechanically weaker cometary materials, based on their typical penetration depths into the Earth's atmosphere. The largest asteroid air burst observed with modern instrumentation was the 500 kt Chelyabinsk meteor in 2013, which shattered windows and produced meteorites.

==== Glancing impact hypothesis ====
In 2020, a group of Russian scientists used a range of computer models to calculate the passage of asteroids with diameters of 200, 100, and 50 metres at oblique angles across Earth's atmosphere. They used a range of assumptions about the object's composition as if it was made of iron, rock, or ice. The model that most closely matched the observed event was an iron asteroid up to 200 metres in diameter, travelling at 11.2 km per second, that glanced off the Earth's atmosphere and returned into solar orbit.

==== Blast pattern ====
The explosion's effect on the trees near the explosion's hypocentre was similar to the effects of the conventional Operation Blowdown in Australia. These effects are caused by the blast wave produced by large air-burst explosions. The trees directly below the explosion are stripped as the blast wave moves vertically downward, but remain standing upright, while trees farther away are knocked over because the blast wave is travelling closer to horizontal when it reaches them.

Soviet experiments performed in the mid-1960s, with model forests (made of matches on wire stakes) and small explosive charges slid downward on wires, produced butterfly-shaped blast patterns similar to the pattern found at the Tunguska site. The experiments suggested that the object had approached at an angle of roughly 30° from the ground and 115° from north, and had exploded in midair.

==== Asteroid or comet ====
In 1934, the British meteorologist and mathematician F. J. W. Whipple suggested that the Tunguska body was a small comet. A comet is composed of dust and volatiles, such as water ice and frozen gases, and could have been completely vaporised by the impact with Earth's atmosphere, leaving no obvious traces. The comet hypothesis was further supported by the glowing skies (or "skyglows" or "bright nights") observed across Eurasia for several evenings after the impact, which are possibly explained by dust and ice that had been dispersed from the comet's tail across the upper atmosphere. The cometary hypothesis gained a general acceptance among Soviet Tunguska investigators by the 1960s.

In 1978, Slovak astronomer Ľubor Kresák suggested that the body was a fragment of Comet Encke, a periodic comet with a period of just over three years that stays entirely within Jupiter's orbit. It is also responsible for the Beta Taurids, an annual meteor shower with a maximum activity around 28–29 June. The Tunguska event coincided with that shower's peak activity, the Tunguska object's approximate trajectory is consistent with what would be expected from a fragment of Comet Encke, and a hypothetical risk corridor has now been calculated demonstrating that if the impactor had arrived a few minutes earlier it would have exploded over the US or Canada. It is now known that bodies of this kind explode at frequent intervals tens to hundreds of kilometres above the ground. Military satellites have been observing these explosions for decades. In 2019 astronomers searched for hypothesised asteroids ~100 metres in diameter from the Taurid swarm between 5–11 July, and 21 July – 10 August. As of February 2020, there have been no reports of discoveries of any such objects.

In 1983, astronomer Zdeněk Sekanina published a paper criticising the comet hypothesis. He pointed out that a body composed of cometary material, travelling through the atmosphere along such a shallow trajectory, ought to have disintegrated, whereas the Tunguska body apparently remained intact into the lower atmosphere. Sekanina also argued that the evidence pointed to a dense rocky object, probably of asteroidal origin. This hypothesis was further boosted in 2001, when Farinella, Foschini, et al. released a study calculating the probabilities based on orbital modelling extracted from the atmospheric trajectories of the Tunguska object. They concluded with a probability of 83% that the object moved on an asteroidal path originating from the asteroid belt, rather than on a cometary one (probability of 17%). Proponents of the comet hypothesis have suggested that the object was an extinct comet with a stony mantle that allowed it to penetrate the atmosphere.

The chief difficulty in the asteroid hypothesis is that a stony object should have produced a large crater where it struck the ground, but no such crater has been found. It has been hypothesised that the asteroid's passage through the atmosphere caused pressures and temperatures to build up to a point where the asteroid abruptly disintegrated in a huge explosion. The destruction would have to have been so complete that no remnants of substantial size survived, and the material scattered into the upper atmosphere during the explosion would have caused the skyglows. Models published in 1993 suggested that the stony body would have been about 60 m (200 ft) across, with physical properties somewhere between an ordinary chondrite and a carbonaceous chondrite. Typical carbonaceous chondrite substance tends to be dissolved with water rather quickly unless it is frozen.

Christopher Chyba and others have proposed a process whereby a stony asteroid could have exhibited the Tunguska impactor's behaviour. Their models show that when the forces opposing a body's descent become greater than the cohesive force holding it together, it blows apart, releasing nearly all its energy at once. The result is no crater, with damage distributed over a fairly wide radius, and all the damage resulting from the thermal energy the blast releases.

During the 1990s, Italian researchers, coordinated by the physicist Giuseppe Longo from the University of Bologna, extracted resin from the core of the trees in the area of impact to examine trapped particles that were present during the 1908 event. They found high levels of material commonly found in rocky asteroids and rarely found in comets.

Kelly et al. (2009) contend that the impact was caused by a comet because of the sightings of noctilucent clouds following the impact, a phenomenon caused by massive amounts of water vapour in the upper atmosphere. They compared the noctilucent cloud phenomenon to the exhaust plume from NASA's Endeavour Space Shuttle. A team of Russian researchers led by Edward Drobyshevski in 2009 suggested that the near-Earth asteroid 2005 NB56 may be a possible candidate for the Tunguska object's parent body as the asteroid made a close approach of 0.06945 astronomical units (27 LD) from Earth on 27 June 1908, three days before the Tunguska impact. The team suspected that 2005 NB_{56}'s orbit likely fits with the Tunguska object's modelled orbit, even with the effects of weak non-gravitational forces. In 2013, analysis of fragments from the Tunguska site by a joint US-European team was consistent with an iron meteorite.

==== Chelyabinsk meteor ====
The February 2013 Chelyabinsk bolide event provided ample data for scientists to create new models for the Tunguska event. Researchers used data from both Tunguska and Chelyabinsk to perform a statistical study of over 50 million combinations of bolide and entry properties that could produce Tunguska-scale damage when breaking apart or exploding at similar altitudes. Some models focused on combinations of properties which created scenarios with similar effects to the tree-fall pattern as well as the atmospheric and seismic pressure waves of Tunguska. Four different computer models produced similar results; they concluded that the likeliest candidate for the Tunguska impactor was a stony body between 50–80 m (164–262 ft) in diameter, entering the atmosphere at roughly 55,000 km/h (34,000 mph), exploding at 10–14 km (6–9 mi) altitude, and releasing explosive energy equivalent to between 10–30 megatons. This is similar to the blast energy equivalent of the 1980 volcanic eruption of Mount St. Helens. The researchers also concluded impactors of this size hit the Earth only at an average interval scale of millennia.

Comparison of possible approximate sizes

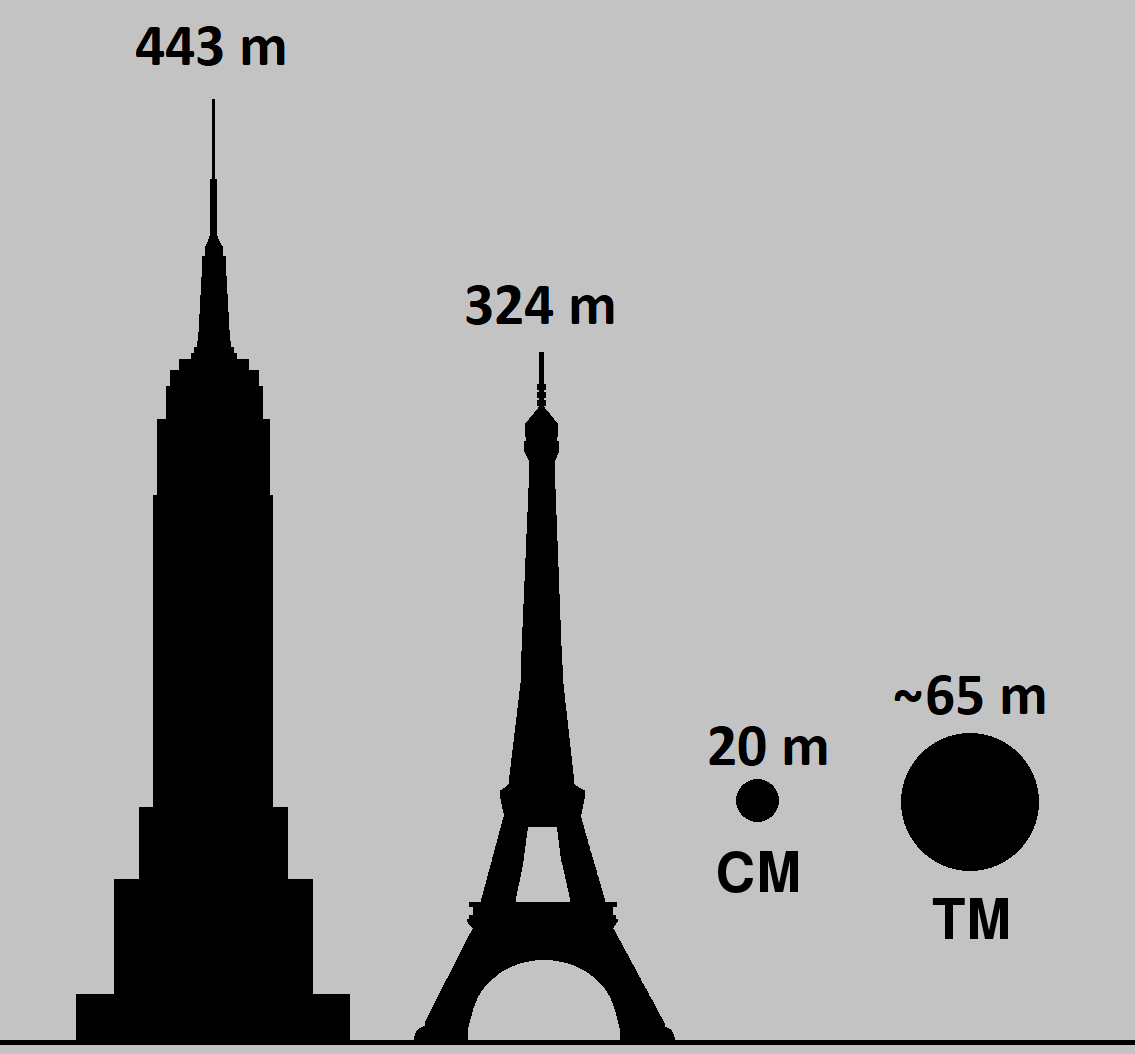
Of Tunguska (TM) and Chelyabinsk (CM) meteoroids to the Eiffel Tower and Empire State Building

Of notable impactors with the Hoba meteorite, a Boeing 747, and a New Routemaster bus

==== Lake Cheko ====
In June 2007, scientists from the University of Bologna identified a lake in the Tunguska region as a possible impact crater from the event. They do not dispute that the Tunguska body exploded in midair, but believe that a 10 m (33 ft) fragment survived the explosion and struck the ground. Lake Cheko is a small bowl-shaped lake about 8 km (5.0 mi) north-northwest of the hypocentre.

The hypothesis has been disputed by other impact crater specialists. A 1961 investigation had dismissed a modern origin of Lake Cheko, saying that the presence of metres-thick silt deposits on the lake bed suggests an age of at least 5,000 years, but more recent research suggests that only a metre or so of the sediment layer on the lake bed is "normal lacustrine sedimentation", a depth consistent with an age of about 100 years. Acoustic-echo soundings of the lake floor support the hypothesis that the Tunguska event formed the lake. The soundings revealed a conical shape for the lake bed, which is consistent with an impact crater. Magnetic readings indicate a possible metre-sized chunk of rock below the lake's deepest point that may be a fragment of the colliding body. Finally, the lake's long axis points to the Tunguska explosion's hypocentre, about 7.0 km (4.3 mi) away. Work is still being done at Lake Cheko to determine its origins.

The main points of the study are that:

Cheko, a small lake located in Siberia close to the epicentre of the 1908 Tunguska explosion, might fill a crater left by the impact of a fragment of a cosmic body. Sediment cores from the lake's bottom were studied to support or reject this hypothesis. A 175-centimetre-long (69 in) core, collected near the center of the lake, consists of an upper c. 1-metre-thick (39 in) sequence of lacustrine deposits overlaying coarser chaotic material. ^{210}Pb and ^{137}Cs indicate that the transition from lower to upper sequence occurred close to the time of the Tunguska event. Pollen analysis reveals that remains of aquatic plants are abundant in the top post-1908 sequence but are absent in the lower pre-1908 portion of the core. These results, including organic C, N, and δ^{13}C data, suggest that Lake Cheko formed at the time of the Tunguska event. Pollen assemblages confirm the presence of two different units, above and below the ~100 cm level. The upper 100 cm long section, in addition to pollen of taiga forest trees such as Abies, Betula, Juniperus, Larix, Pinus, Picea, and Populus, contains abundant remains of hydrophytes, i.e., aquatic plants probably deposited under lacustrine conditions similar to those prevailing today. These include both free-floating plants and rooted plants, growing usually in water up to 3–4 metres in depth (Callitriche, Hottonia, Lemna, Hydrocharis, Myriophyllum, Nuphar, Nymphaea, Potamogeton, Sagittaria). In contrast, the lower unit (below ~100 cm) contains abundant forest tree pollen, but no hydrophytes, suggesting that no lake existed then, but a taiga forest growing on marshy ground. Pollen and microcharcoal show a progressive reduction in the taiga forest, from the bottom of the core upward. This reduction may have been caused by fires (two local episodes below ~100 cm), then by the TE and the formation of the lake (between 100 and 90 cm), and again by subsequent fires (one local fire in the upper 40 cm).

In 2017, new research by Russian scientists pointed to a rejection of the theory that the Tunguska event created Lake Cheko. They used soil research to determine that the lake is 280 years old or even much older; in any case clearly older than the Tunguska event. In analysing soils from the bottom of Lake Cheko, they identified a layer of radionuclide contamination from mid-20th century nuclear testing at Novaya Zemlya. The depth of this layer gave an average annual sedimentation rate of between 3.6 and 4.6 mm a year. These sedimentation values are less than half of the 1 cm/year calculated by Gasperini et al. in their 2009 publication on their analysis of the core they took from Lake Cheko in 1999. The Russian scientists in 2017 counted at least 280 such annual varves in the 1260 mm long core sample pulled from the bottom of the lake, representing an age older than the Tunguska event.

Additionally, there are problems with impact physics: It is unlikely that a stony meteorite in the right size range would have the mechanical strength necessary to survive atmospheric passage intact while retaining a velocity high enough to excavate a crater that size on reaching the ground.

=== Proposed terrestrial explanations ===
Although the scientific community agrees that the Tunguska event was caused by the air burst of a celestial body, more recent alternative hypotheses challenge this model and suggest a terrestrial origin instead, relying notably on the presence of an ancient volcanic crater at the epicenter site. In a series of publications dating back to 1997, Russian physicist Andrei Yu. Ol'khovatov argues that the cataclysm resulted from an unknown terrestrial phenomenon, driven by the coupling of tectonic and atmospheric processes in a "very rare combination of favorable geophysical factors". In support of his interpretation, he highlights the epicenter's location at the intersection of major tectonic faults, occurring alongside a peak in regional seismicity in late June 1908. He also cites several concurrent anomalies, such as an unusual variation in the Earth's polhode, a surge in global volcanic activity, a local peak in atmospheric pressure, and a sudden meteorological shift. According to him, this exceptional conjunction points to a complex geophysical discharge rather than a cosmic impact. Although his model is not supported by the wider scientific community, the author has maintained his position in more recent works.

Based after Ol'khovatov's work, German astrophysicist Wolfgang Kundt proposed between 2001 and 2007 that the Tunguska event resulted from the sudden eruption of about ten million tons of natural gas. According to his model, which is also based on the epicenter site's geology, pressurized gas composed primarily of methane escaped from the Earth's crust at supersonic speeds into the upper atmosphere, where it formed an explosive mixture ignited by lightning. The combustion then propagated down to the ground, triggering powerful explosions. Kundt argued that this outgassing, comparable to the formation of kimberlites or maars, would explain the multicentric pattern of fallen trees and the untouched areas in the valleys. He also cited the absence of confirmed meteoritic debris or space dust, as well as the few bright nights reported in the days preceding the explosion, which he attributed to preliminary tectonic outgassing caused by building subsurface pressure. In 2007, Longo disputed Kundt's hypothesis, pointing out that almost all eyewitness accounts described the passage of a bolide through the sky. Furthermore, despite the presence of an ancient volcano in the region, the site is tectonically stable, as indicated by its low intraplate seismicity, and lacks mantle rocks such as peridotite or eclogite. Longo also pointed to the absence of a significant dust or debris layer near the epicenter, which would be expected following a volcanic explosion or a diatreme eruption. Longo concluded that an airburst better explains the observed phenomena. However, he suggested that heat from the explosion could have thawed the permafrost and released methane, which would explain the secondary explosions reported for over half an hour. This same outgassing, caused by the decomposition of shallow organic matter, could also explain the small depression identified at the bottom of Lake Cheko in 1999.

In 2004, American geophysicist Jason P. Morgan and colleagues suggested that the Tunguska event could be a verneshot, a hypothetical volcanic eruption caused by the accumulation of gas beneath a craton and capable of launching lithospheric material into the stratosphere at supersonic speeds. In addition to the existence of an ancient volcano, the researchers based their hypothesis on the suspected presence of shocked quartz and iron-rich microspherules at the epicenter. With damage significantly lower than that of major verneshots associated with earlier mass extinctions, the 1908 event would thus represent a "micro-verneshot". In 2015, a study led by Italian geologist Paola Vannucchi provided further arguments in support of this model. Petrographic analysis of quartzite samples collected from Mount Stoikovich revealed microstructures attributed to shock metamorphism, such as planar deformation features in quartz, thermally altered quartz, and pseudotachylite veinlets. Judging that the formation of these structures would require pressures exceeding 10 GPa, the authors ruled out their origination from the 1908 event or glacial transport. Estimating the probability of a celestial body randomly striking an ancient impact crater on Earth at less than one in 17 000, they concluded that this metamorphism resulted from a verneshot during the emplacement of the Siberian Traps at the end of the Permian; the 1908 explosion would then have resulted from secondary degassing along this same zone of lithospheric weakness.

The verneshot hypothesis nevertheless remains disputed. On the centennial of the event, the American physicist Mark Boslough stated in New Scientist that no evidence justified rejecting the cosmic impact model. Furthermore, the conclusions of Vannucchi and her colleagues were strongly disputed by German geologist Martin Schmieder and his team. According to them, the samples show only ordinary tectonic deformation rather than shock metamorphism, which in natural settings can only derive from a meteoritic impact, thereby invalidating the verneshot scenario. In response to this criticism, Vannucchi and Morgan maintained that shock metamorphism rests on a line of evidence, including the joint presence of thermally altered quartz, pseudotachylites, and rapid cooling structures. Comparing this assemblage to that of recognized impact craters such as the Manson crater in Iowa, United States, they reaffirmed that these rocks demonstrate an extreme shock event that occurred in the distant past, thereby supporting the volcanic model. Subsequent studies nevertheless continue to challenge this interpretation. In 2015, Bonatti and his team considered it unlikely that a mantle anomaly could persist in the same location for 250 million years. In 2025, Kletetschka and colleagues noted that magmatic pressures and temperatures remain far too low to produce shocked quartz or melt its grains.

== Similar events ==
A smaller air burst occurred over a populated area on 15 February 2013, at Chelyabinsk in the Ural district of Russia. The exploding meteoroid was determined to have been an asteroid that measured about 17–20 m (56–66 ft) across. It had an estimated initial mass of 11,000 tons and exploded with an energy release of approximately 500 kilotons. The air burst inflicted over 1,200 injuries, mainly from broken glass falling from windows shattered by its shock wave.

Another meteor air burst occurred off the east coast of the Kamchatka Peninsula in eastern Russia on 18 December 2018. This was the third largest recorded meteor since 1900 after the Chelyabinsk meteor entry in February 2013 and the Tunguska event.

Comparing the Tunguska (1), Chelyabinsk (2) and Kamchatka (3) events' locations

== Erroneous statements ==
=== Number and diameter of fallen trees ===
A popular claim stating that approximately 80 million trees were felled and burned by the blast is frequently cited in scientific literature. This figure overestimates the energy released and the size of the impactor, while paradoxically underestimating global risk, as large near-Earth objects are rarer than smaller ones. In 2025, Boslough and Andy Bruno showed that this misconception was popularised by Mark W. Brazo and Steven A. Austin in a non-peer-reviewed 1982 paper. (Note: Although a 1969 publication already cited this estimated number without a source, it was the 1982 paper that anchored its modern dissemination.) Published by the Institute for Creation Research and in the journal Origins, both known for advocating Young Earth creationism, these organizations promote biblical and catastrophic interpretations of geological events. Brazo and Austin based their estimate of the felled trees on a 1934 paper by Whipple. However, the latter merely reported comments by Indian meteorologist Sudhanshu K. Banerji, who mentioned 80 million trees over an area of 8,000 km^{2} (3,100 sq mi). This statement itself appears to mirror, without directly citing, a figure circulated earlier that year by English astronomer Andrew Crommelin, who presented as an established fact the preliminary data published by Astapovich in his 1933 study. While evaluating the explosion's energy, Astapovich assumed a devastated area of roughly 8,000 km^{2} (3,100 sq mi), thereby estimating the number of felled trees at 8 × 10^{7}.

In 2026, Boslough and his colleagues identified a key milestone in the modern dissemination of this myth occurring in 2006, when BBC News reported this figure in an article on the documentary Tutankhamun's Fireball from the series Horizon. The British version mentioned "more than 18 million" trees felled, compared to over 80 million in the American version on National Geographic. Executive producer James Reed, however, confirmed that he relied on two peer-reviewed sources mentioning the latter figure, whereas no publication prior to 2006 mentioned 18 million. This value may therefore stem from a typographical error in the British script, subsequently spread by the BBC News article. Ironically, this number turned out to be much closer to reality, as the initial estimate overestimated the damage by a factor of about four. Boslough and his colleagues also identified a 2008 Scientific American article published for the event's centennial as another vector of propagation, written by three researchers from the University of Bologna, one of whose sidebars claimed that the explosion felled roughly 80 million trees over 2,000 km^{2} (770 sq mi). When questioned about this by Boslough, Gasperini, the lead author of the paper, stated he could not clearly explain its origin. Another Scientific American article published during the centennial reported a figure of 60 million trees felled over the same area.

Another claim propagated by Brazo and Austin's 1982 paper states that the trees knocked down by the explosion measured 1 m (3 ft 3 in) in diameter in cross section. The first estimates on this were made by Kulik during the discovery of the epicenter in 1927, who preliminarily estimated the diameter of the largest felled trees to be between 44 and 88 cm (17 and 35 in). Subsequent surveys conducted in the 1950s revealed that the largest specimens were actually in the lower part of this range, with Fast and his colleagues setting a maximum measurement of 30 cm (12 in) in 1983. Nevertheless, Brazo and Austin focused solely on Kulik's upper and obsolete estimate, to which they added a few centimeters to reach 91.4 cm (36.0 in). In a 2025 article published in Scientific Reports—since retracted and heavily criticized for its dubious validity—the estimated tree size thus climbed to over a meter.

=== "Forest craters" ===
Many online accounts of the Tunguska event use photographs of circular Siberian clearings, giving the impression that they are impact craters. However, this depiction contradicts the scientific consensus favoring an air burst. A cratering impact would imply a much lower burst altitude and substantial surviving mass, which is contradicted by numerical simulations confirming a purely atmospheric explosion in which no solid meteoritic material struck the ground at hypervelocity. The most widely used photograph, taken and published in 2004 by Russian astronomer Vitaly Romeyko, shows a clearing he had spotted as early as 1994 approximately 25 km (16 mi) northwest of the epicenter (61°02′26.2″N 101°31′15″E). A similar feature, nicknamed the "Devil's Cemetery", is located about 300 km (190 mi) to the south (58°13′53″N 100°15′32.4″E). Searches based on its local name often return Romeyko's image, sometimes mirrored. This confusion led Boslough and colleagues to misidentify the feature in their 2024 abstract for the Geological Society of America, before corrected in their 2026 study.

== Environmental consequences ==
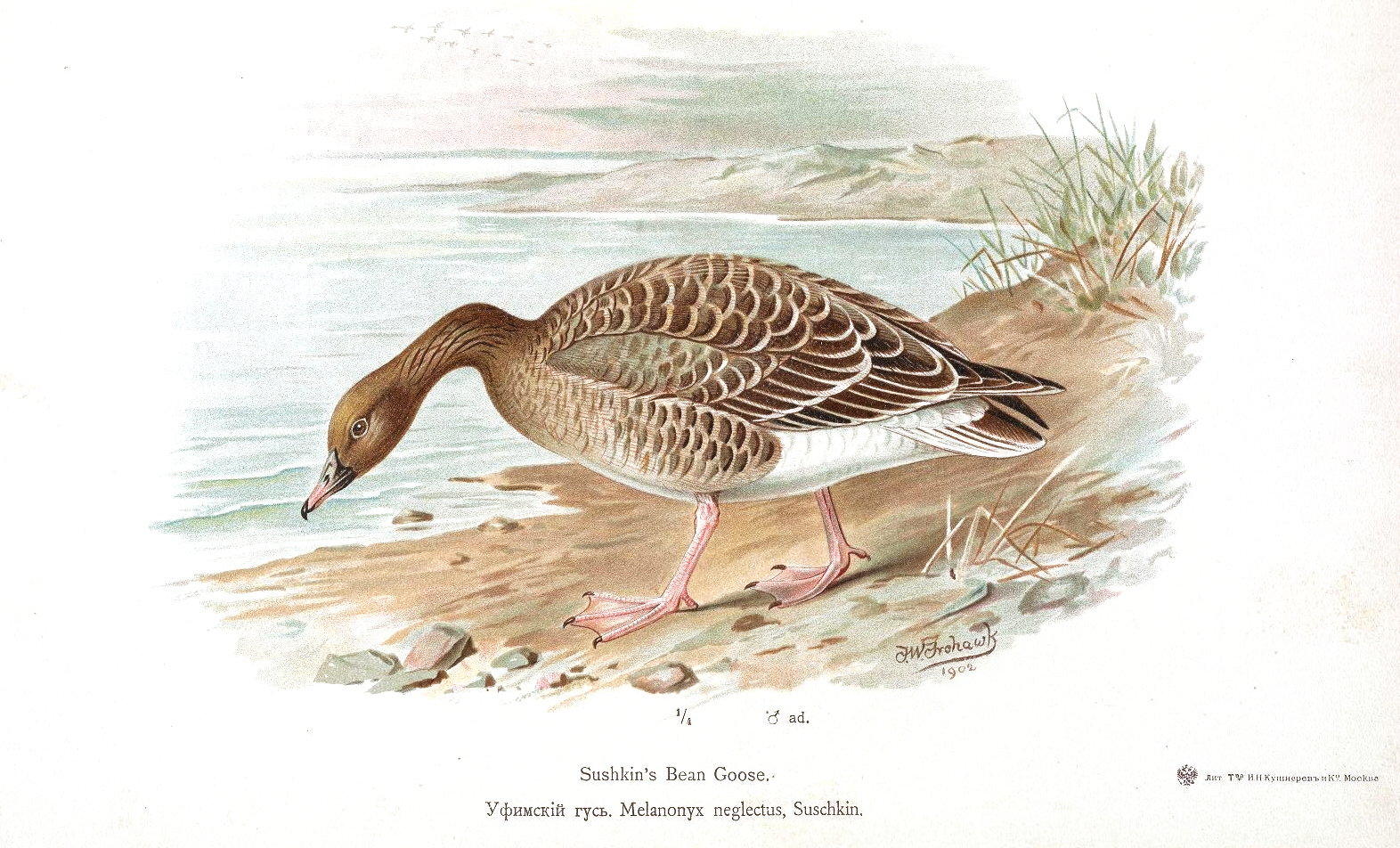
1905 illustration by Frederick W. Frohawk of the Sushkin's goose (Anser neglectus), a bird species that may have gone extinct as a result of the Tunguska event.

In a 2019 study, Belgian ornithologist Jacques Van Impe hypothesized a link between the Tunguska event and the extinction of Sushkin's goose (Anser neglectus). Described in 1897 by Russian naturalist Petr Sushkin, the taxon's status was long disputed due to the lack of known breeding grounds, with several authors viewing it as a mere subspecies, individual variation, or mutation of the taiga bean goose (Anser fabalis). Relying on morphological and vocal criteria, Van Impe nevertheless defends its status as a distinct species. In the early 20th century, large populations wintered in Bashkortostan, near Tashkent, and in Hortobágy National Park in Hungary, with the latter location hosting up to 150 000 individuals between 1908 and 1911. However, the taxon declined rapidly, and the last known specimens were observed at the Budapest Zoo and Botanical Garden in 1934, after which the species went extinct. With no period studies indicating major overhunting or an epidemic affecting the species, Van Impe hypothesizes that it nested in the then-unexplored area of the Podkamennaya Tunguska basin directly affected by the 1908 event. The explosion, fires, and environmental degradation would have devastated the core of the breeding population. The author also suggests that electromagnetic phenomena associated with the event might have altered the birds' migratory orientation or induced genetic anomalies detrimental to their reproduction. Although habitat modification and hunting may have exacerbated the decline, Van Impe considers them insufficient to explain the species' sudden collapse, concluding that the Tunguska event would be the primary triggering factor.

== Popular culture ==
=== In fiction ===
The Tunguska event appeared in several works of fiction, which proposed various interpretations of it. The most widespread attributed it to an extraterrestrial spacecraft, an idea perhaps introduced as early as 1930 in the short story The Second Missile by Ed Earl Repp. This interpretation gained popularity following the 1946 publication of the short story Explosion by Russian science fiction writer Alexander Kazantsev, who, inspired by similarities between the event and the atomic bombing of Hiroshima, imagined the nuclear explosion of a spacecraft engine from Mars. Other works proposed variations, such as the 1983 novel Chekhov's Journey by Ian Watson, which attributed the event to a human-made spacecraft, or the 1975 short story The Borderland of Sol by Larry Niven, which featured the impact of a micro black hole. Some works nevertheless retained the conventional explanation of a meteoritic impact, such as the 1996 episode Tunguska from the television series The X-Files, in which the impact was associated with the introduction of microbial extraterrestrial life to Earth.

=== "Death ray" urban legend ===
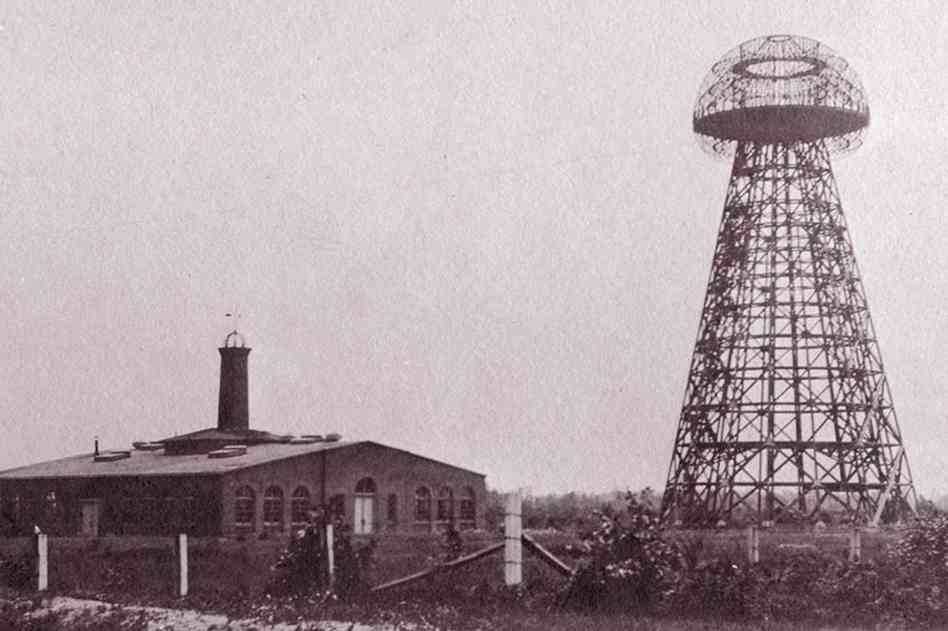
A popular urban legend associates the Tunguska event with a failed "death ray" test conducted by Nikola Tesla from the Wardenclyffe Tower (shown here in 1904), a claim contradicted by historical facts.

A famous urban legend associates the Tunguska event with a miscalibrated test of a "death ray" attributed to Nikola Tesla. According to this narrative, the inventor took advantage of American explorer Robert Peary's second Arctic expedition in the summer of 1908, asking him to report any unusual phenomena. On the night of 30 June, from the top of Wardenclyffe Tower in New York and in the presence of his assistant George Scherff, Tesla allegedly fired a powerful energy beam toward an area west of Peary's route. Receiving no immediate reaction in the press or via telegram, Tesla soon learned of the massive explosion in Siberia. Relieved by the supposed absence of human casualties (a claim contradicted by local witness accounts), the inventor, frightened by the devastating power of his device, reportedly decided to dismantle it immediately.

This story was devised by an unknown American author in a 1994 fictionalized biography of Tesla, connecting three separate historical elements from the 1908. Later popularized by an episode of the television series Sightings and subsequently relayed in various books and online accounts, it is nevertheless contradicted by historical reality. First, due to a lack of funding, Tesla never completed Wardenclyffe Tower, and none of his writings contemporaneous with the event mention a "death ray". The earliest known reference to such a concept only appeared in 1937, in a technical article describing a particle beam weapon intended to destroy tanks—a project that was never realized. Furthermore, Tesla could only have learned about the event in 1928, when stories about it first appeared in the American press. In addition, Peary's expedition archives and records preserve no trace of any request or correspondence from the inventor.

=== International Asteroid Day ===
In 2016, the United Nations proclaimed 30 June as the annual International Asteroid Day, to raise awareness about asteroids and efforts at planetary defence.

== See also ==
- Krasnoyarsk Krai
- Tunguska Nature Reserve
- Chelyabinsk meteor
- 1930 Curuçá River event
- Sikhote-Alin meteorite
