= Vannucchi =

Vannucchi is a surname. Notable people with the surname include:

- Anton Maria Vannucchi (1724 – 1792), Italian lawyer
- Aldo Vannucchi (born 1928), Brazilian educator
- Gianmarco Vannucchi (born 1995), Italian footballer
- Ighli Vannucchi (born 1977), Italian footballer
- Luigi Vannucchi (1930–1978), Italian actor
- Paola Vannucchi, Italian geologist

== See also ==
- Vannucci
