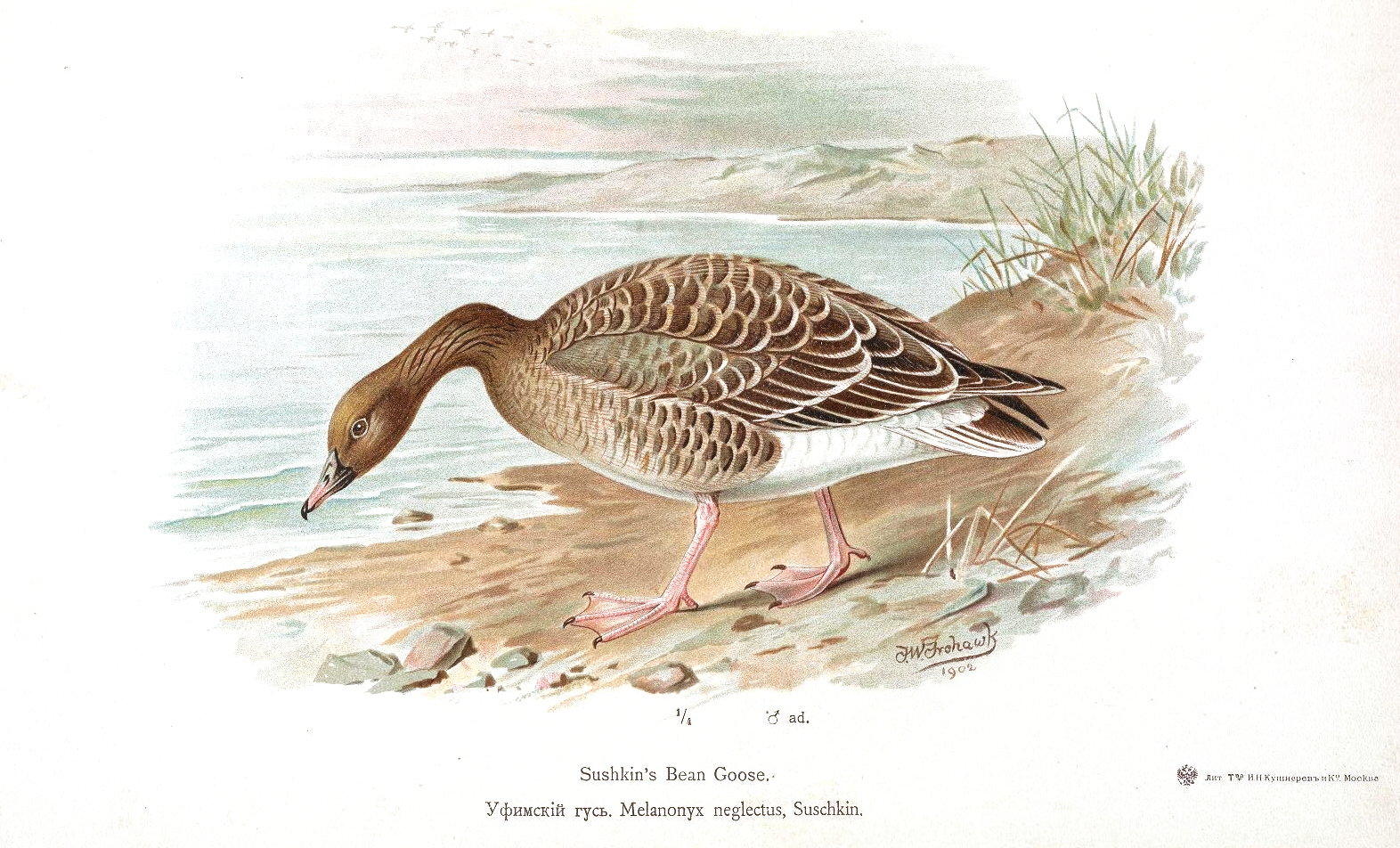

Scientific classification
- Kingdom: Animalia
- Phylum: Chordata
- Class: Aves
- Order: Anseriformes
- Family: Anatidae
- Genus: Anser
- Species: A. neglectus

Binomial name
- Anser neglectus Sushkin, 1897

= Sushkin's goose =

Species of goose thought to be extinct

Sushkin's goose (Anser neglectus) was a putative species of goose now thought to be extinct. The status as a species has been contested and a 2022 DNA study based on five specimens found no evidence of genetic isolation. It has sometimes been considered a subspecies of the bean goose but some have proposed, based on descriptions in life and specimens, that it was distinctive enough to be treated as a full species. It has been suggested that the Tunguska event of 1908 may have wiped out most of the breeding population in the Taiga region resulting in its dwindling to extinction. Some geese with "neglectus" type characters have been recorded suggesting that the last few populations hybridized with other geese such as the tundra and taiga bean goose in the breeding region.

== Description ==
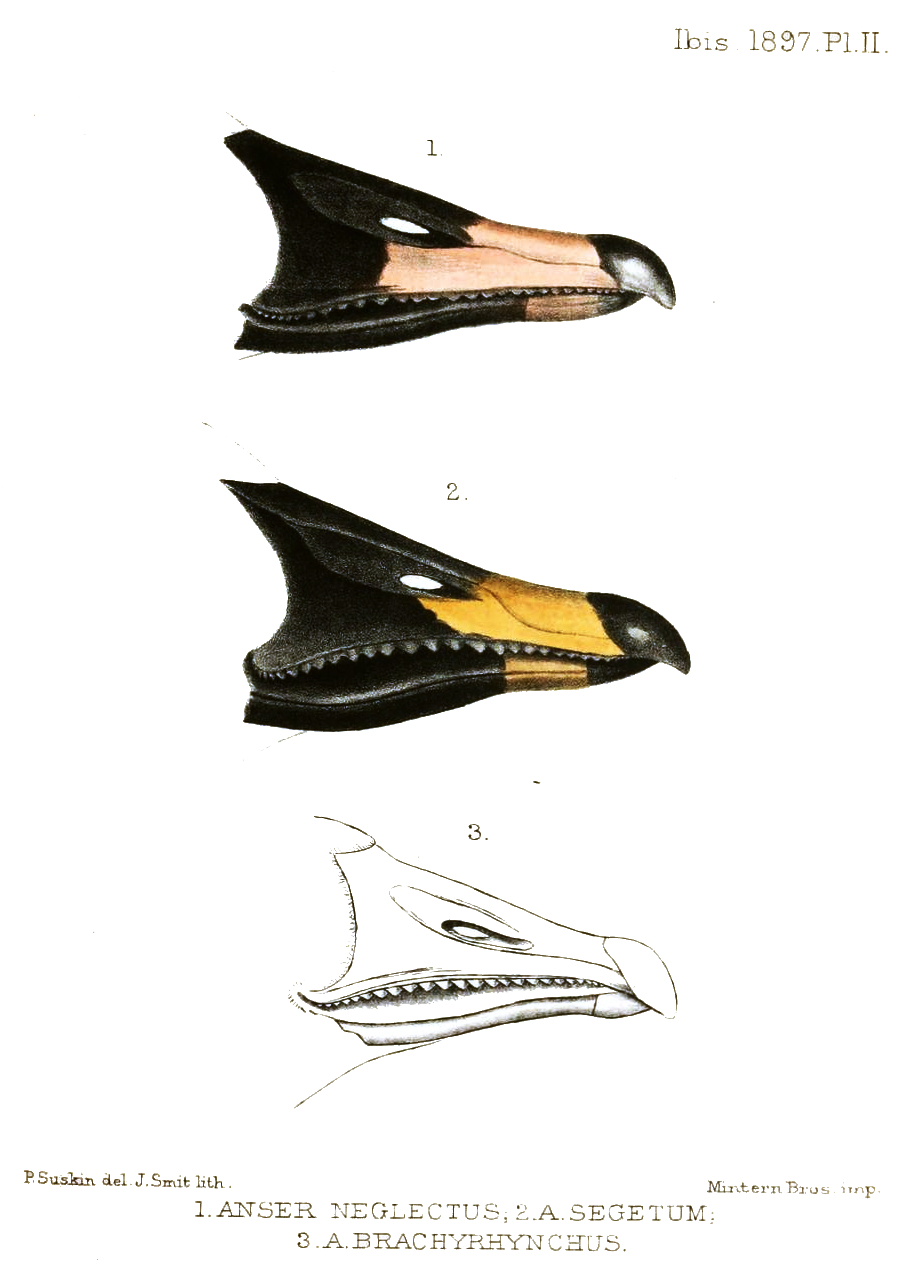
Bill of Sushkin's goose (above) compared with that of Anser serrirostris rossicus (middle) and Anser brachyrhynchus (below)

The species was first described by Professor Petr Sushkin in 1897 based on eight specimens obtained from wintering grounds in Bashkiria. Large numbers were known to winter near Tashkent and Hortobágy in eastern Hungary. Nearly 150,000 were known to winter in Hungary between 1908 and 1911. It had a distinctive double-note “Gé-gé” call, and differed in the size of its bill and its colouration. The feet were pink and the mid portion of the bill was fleshy or rosy, unlike orange in bean geese. The sizes were closer to Anser fabalis rossicus. It was considered as a valid species until it was downgraded by Johansen in 1945. As much of the literature on the species has not been in English, it has largely been ignored. The last known living birds were in the Budapest zoo in 1934. Individuals of Anser serrirostris and Anser fabalis with similar bill colours have been reported which might suggest that the species formerly interbred at the edges of its breeding range.

A large molecular genetics study of bean geese populations used a few examples of what were termed as "neglectus" suggested that they were within the range of variations of a single species. However, it was pointed out, based on the measurements of the bills, that the sequenced specimens claimed as neglectus were in-fact not suitable exemplars, possibly not even representing the true neglectus. Another study in 2022 based on mitochondrial DNA found that neglectus specimens did not have any unique sequence signature and they could be grouped with rossicus or fabalis and might merely reflect developmental and carotenoid pigmentation variations. One specimen showed genetic markers associated with A. middendorfi but was morphologically similar to fabalis.

The breeding zone of the form was never discovered but it has been suggested that it may have been in the Podkamennaya Tunguska river and its basin which was ornithologically under-explored.
