= Tunguska Nature Reserve =

Strict nature reserve in Krasnoyarsk Krai, Russia

- Russian: Тунгусский заповедник (Also: Tungussky)
- IUCN category Ia (strict nature reserve)
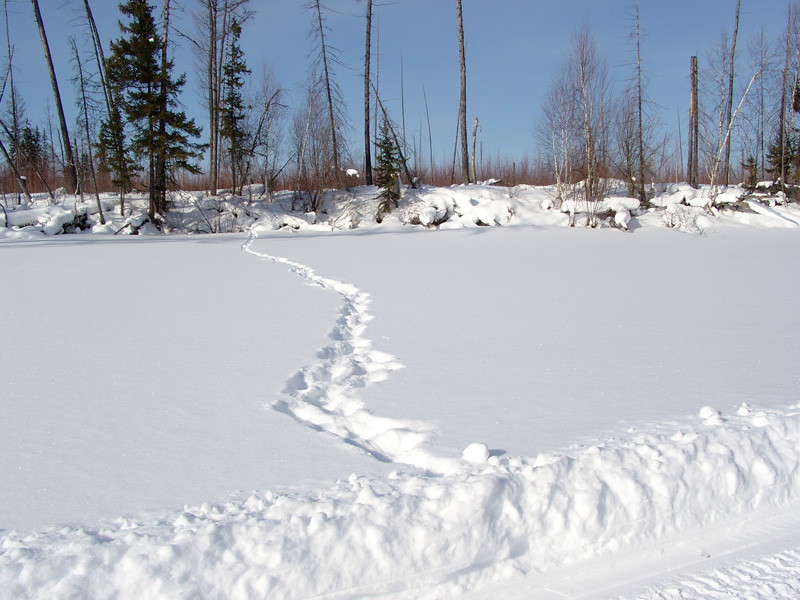
- Tracks in Tunguska Zapovednik

- Location within Russia
- Location: Krasnoyarsk Krai
- Nearest city: Vanavara
- Coordinates: 60°43′53″N 101°58′3″E
- Area: 296,562 hectares (732,821 acres; 1,145 sq mi)
- Established: 1995
- Governing body: Ministry of Natural Resources and Environment (Russia)
- Website: http://xn----8sbgbiflggdjj1aklp1aapuc.xn--p1ai/

Tunguska Nature Reserve (Russian: Тунгусский заповедник) (also Tungussky) is a Russian 'zapovednik' (strict nature reserve) located in the central part of the Central Siberian Plateau. As a result of a meteorite in 1908, more than 2,000 km^{2} of boreal forest was felled and burned. The taiga affected in the disaster area has been restored in the past 100 years. The reserve is situated in the Evenkiysky District of Krasnoyarsk Krai.

== Topography ==
The reserve sits on a low plateau, with deeply cut river valleys. The valley tops resemble elongated ridges, with hills of a typical height of 100–300 meters. The highest point in the territory is 602 meters above sea level. The Tunguska Event occurred on the northern edge of the reserve. The Stony Tunguska River (Podkamennaya Tunguska River) runs across the southern border of the site. Two main rivers run south through the reserve, the Chamby River and the Hushmy River. The river valleys are generally waterlogged when not frozen. Lake Cheko, a round, picturesque thermokarst lake is on the northern border of the site; it has been suggested as a possible impact site of the 1908 meteorite fall.

== Climate and ecoregion ==
Tunguska is located in the East Siberian taiga ecoregion, which sits between the Yenisei River and Lena River. Its northern border reaches the Arctic Circle, and its southern border reaches 52°N latitude. The dominant vegetation is light coniferous taiga with Dahurian larch (Larix gmelinii) forming the canopy in areas with low snow cover. This ecoregion is rich in minerals.

The climate of Tunguska is Subarctic climate, without dry season (Köppen climate classification Subarctic climate (Dfc)). This climate is characterized by mild summers (only 1–3 months above 10 °C (50.0 °F)) and cold, snowy winters (coldest month below −3 °C (26.6 °F)).

== Flora and fauna ==
About 70% of the territory is forested, a further 15-20% is swamp. Aside from the dominant larch (Larix × czekanowskii, Larix gmelinii) and pine (Pinus sylvestris, Pinus sibirica) there are occasional spruce (Picea obovata). There is undergrowth of alder, dwarf birch, cranberries, blueberries, grasses, mosses and a covering of lichens. Scientists on the reserve have recorded 314 species of angiosperms.

The animals of the reserve are characteristic of the central Siberian taiga. Mammals include elk, brown bear, sable, squirrel, wolf, caribou, and wolverine. Scientists on the reserve have recorded 41 species of mammals and 19 species of fish. Birds are mostly wetland species; 170 species have been recorded in the territory.

== History ==
A number of archaeological sites from the Neolithic Period (3,000-4,000 BC) have been identified on the site, with stone tools, ceramics and bone fragments.

== Ecoeducation and access ==
As a strict nature reserve, the Tunguska Reserve is mostly closed to the general public, although scientists and those with 'environmental education' purposes can make arrangements with park management for visits. There are four 'ecotourist' routes in the reserve that are open to the public but require permits to be obtained in advance. All four lead to the presumed site of the meteor explosion. The main office is in the city of Vanavara. There are several flights per week to Vanavara from Krasnoyarsk.

== See also ==
- List of Russian Nature Reserves (class 1a 'zapovedniks')
