= Van Impe =

Van Impe or van Impe may refer to:

- Darren Van Impe (born 1973), Canadian ice hockey player
- Ed Van Impe (1940–2025), Canadian ice hockey player
- Jack Van Impe (1931–2020), American televangelist
- Jacques Van Impe (born 1941), Belgian ornithologist
- Kevin Van Impe (born 1981), Belgian cyclist
- Lucien Van Impe (born 1946), Belgian cyclist
