= Vanavara =

Vanavara may refer to:

- Vanavara (rural locality), a rural locality (a selo) in Krasnoyarsk Krai, Russia
- Vanavara Airport, an airport in Krasnoyarsk Krai, Russia
- 6404 Vanavara, a main-belt asteroid
