= Lake Cheko =

Lake in Krasnoyarsk Krai, Russia

- Чеко (Russian)
- Location in Russia Lake Cheko (Krasnoyarsk Krai)
- Location: near Podkamennaya Tunguska River, Siberia
- Coordinates: 60.964°N 101.86°E
- Primary inflows: Kimchu
- Primary outflows: Kimchu
- Basin countries: Russia
- Average depth: 50 metres (160 ft)

Lake Cheko (Russian: Чеко) is a small freshwater lake in Siberia, near the Podkamennaya Tunguska River, in what is now the Evenkiysky District of the Krasnoyarsk Krai.

It is primarily known for its proposed relationship with the 1908 Tunguska event.

== Dimensions and environs ==
Lake Cheko is a small bowl-shaped lake. It is about 500 metres (1,600 ft) long, 300 metres (980 ft) wide and 50 metres (160 ft) deep.

In the lake flows the Kimchu River (Russian: Кимчу), which flows into the Chunya River (Russian: Чуня), which in turn flows into the Podkamennaya Tunguska.

Lake Cheko is roughly 8 kilometres (5.0 mi) north-northwest of the epicenter of the Tunguska event. The lake is inside the blast zone, and in the probable direction of whatever caused the Tunguska event.

== Proposed impact origin ==
A 1961 investigation estimated the age of the lake to be at least 5000 years, based on meters-thick silt deposits on the lake bed. However, Luca Gasperini and his co-investigators working in 2008 concluded that the sediments, isotopes, and pollen "suggest that Lake Cheko formed at the time of the Tunguska Event" and thus was only 100 years old. They also reported that acoustic-echo soundings revealed a conical shape for the lake bed, which they interpreted as consistent with an impact crater. They said the lake's long axis points to the hypocenter of the Tunguska explosion, about 7.0 km away, and they interpreted magnetic readings as indicative of a possible meter-sized chunk of rock below the lake's deepest point, that they suggested could be a meteorite.

In 2008, a BBC News story on the 100th anniversary of the Tunguska Event mentioned that researchers at Imperial College London had pointed out that many of the trees surrounding the lake are older than 100 years, which suggests that the lake could not have been created by an impact in 1908. The researchers also pointed out other problems, including the morphology of the lake and the surrounding terrain, and the lack of impactor debris and ejecta, noting that the characteristics of the impactor required by the impact theory are inconsistent with existing models of the known features of the event. Other researchers have said it is unlikely that a stony meteorite in the right size range would have the mechanical strength necessary to survive atmospheric passage intact, and yet still retain a velocity large enough to excavate a crater that size on reaching the ground.

In 2017, Russian scientists reported isotope evidence showing the lake is older than the Tunguska Event.

== See also ==
- List of possible impact structures on Earth
