= 1994 Vanavara Yakovlev Yak-40 crash =

Fatal plane crash in Russia

Coordinates: 60°41′34″N 102°4′56″E

1994 Vanavara air disaster
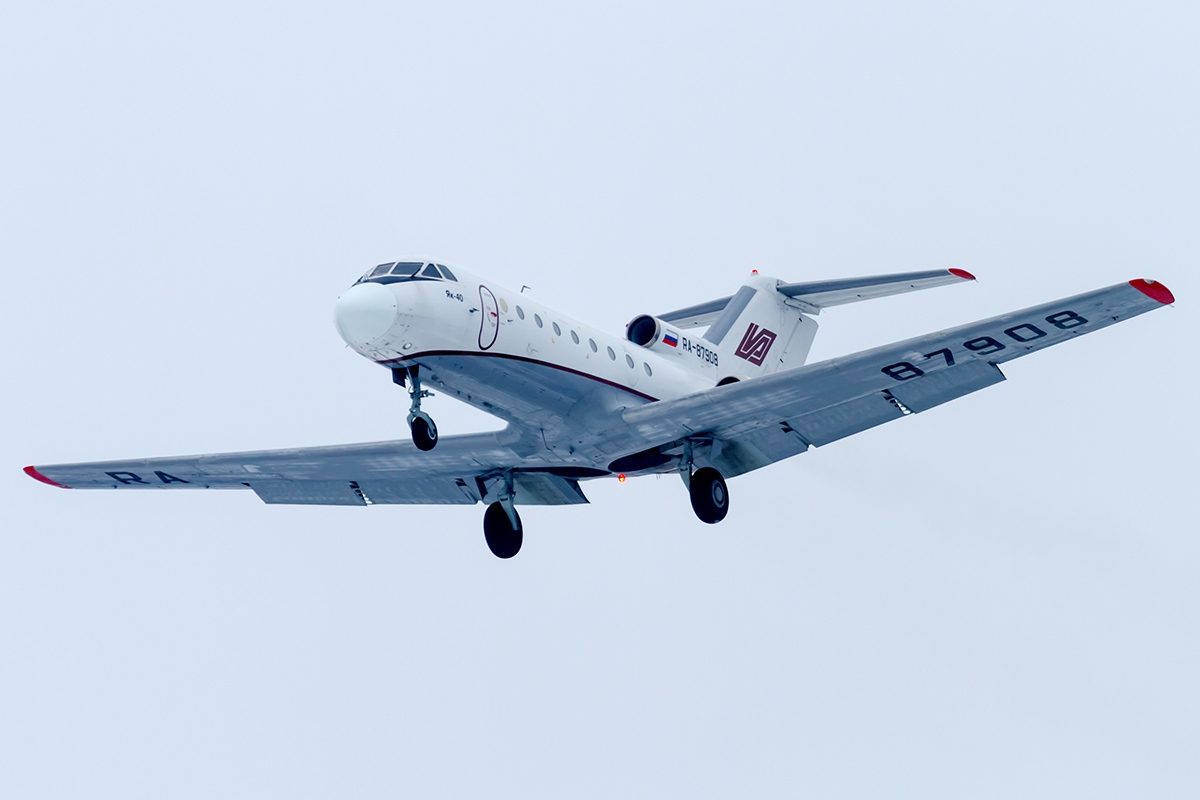
- A Yak-40 similar to the one involved in the disaster

Accident
- Date: 26 September 1994
- Summary: Fuel exhaustion due to pilot error
- Site: Vanavary, Evenki Autonomous District, Krasnoyarsk Krai, Russia

Aircraft
- Aircraft type: Yakovlev Yak-40
- Operator: Cheremshanka Airlines
- Registration: RA-87468
- Flight origin: Krasnoyarsk Airport, Krasnoyarsk Krai, Russia
- Destination: Tura Airport, Krasnoyarsk Krai, Russia
- Passengers: 24
- Crew: 4
- Fatalities: 28
- Survivors: 0

On 26 September 1994, a Yakovlev Yak-40, operated by Russian regional airliner Cheremshanka Airlines, crashed onto the bank of a river near Vanavara, Russia. All 24 passengers and 4 crew members died. The Russian investigation team concluded that pilot error was the cause of the crash. Poor weather conditions had required the flight to abort several landing attempts and the air crew failed to maintain awareness of the fuel quantity. This resulted in the aircraft crashing due to fuel exhaustion. Subsequently, the investigation team blamed the airport for "not reporting the weather condition" in a timely manner to the crew.

== Flight ==
The flight was operated by Cheremshanka Airlines, a regional airline based at Krasnoyarsk Cheremshanka Airport. At the time of the accident, the Yakovlev Yak-40 was carrying 24 passengers, including 21 adults and 3 children, and 4 crew members. The pilot of the flight was Captain Anatoliy A. Danilov and the co-pilot was First Officer Anatoliy G. Shcherbakov. Also on board was a flight mechanic Mikhail N. Shurpatov and one flight attendant.

Weather conditions had begun to deteriorate while the aircraft was en route to Tura Airport, but ATC in Tura failed to inform the flight crew of the changing conditions. The crew were therefore caught unaware by the poor weather when they arrived in Tura. Due to the limited visibility, the crew missed the airport. After three failed landing attempts, the crew decided to divert to Vanavara airfield, a small airport some 453 kilometers away from Tura Airport.

41 kilometers from Vanavara, at an altitude of 3,000 meters, the airliner's engines flamed out as the fuel supply was exhausted. The crew then decided to make an emergency landing in a swamp. Two helicopters and an An-24 aircraft were trying to help, suggesting the Yak-40's direction to the swamp where it would be possible to make an emergency landing. The crew then decided to land on the bank of the Chamba River.

Captain Danilov ordered First Officer Shcherbakov and the flight mechanic Shurpatov to look out from the window and see if they could find the Chamba River. The landing gear was extended by the crew started its initial descent. At a speed of 235 km/h, the aircraft sheared tree tops and the right wing detached from the airframe. The Yak-40 then rolled severely to the right and crashed into the bank of the Chamba River inverted, with the front portion in the water and the empennage resting on shore. There was no explosion or fire since the aircraft had run out of fuel, but the impact was not survivable. All 28 people on board died.

Footage from the crash site, taken from a helicopter, showed that the cockpit of the Yak-40 was completely destroyed. The fuselage was crushed severely while the tail was relatively intact. Crash victims, along with their belongings, were strewn in a large grassy area near the wreckage.

== Investigation ==
The commission investigating the incident concluded that the catastrophe occurred due to a number of factors:

- The crew incorrectly calculated the fuel supply required for the flight
- The duty navigator of Cheremshanka Airport, V.A. Tsurikov, did not properly prepare the crew for the flight
- The dispatcher did not inform the crew in a timely manner about the sharp deterioration of weather at Tura Airport
- With a shortage of fuel on board, the crew chose to divert to Vanavara, which was over four hundred kilometers away, when Baykit airfield was a hundred kilometers closer (354 kilometers)
- When approaching in Vanavara, the crew incorrectly chose the flight level, as well as the point of the beginning of the descent
