= East Siberian taiga =

Biogeographic region in eastern Russia

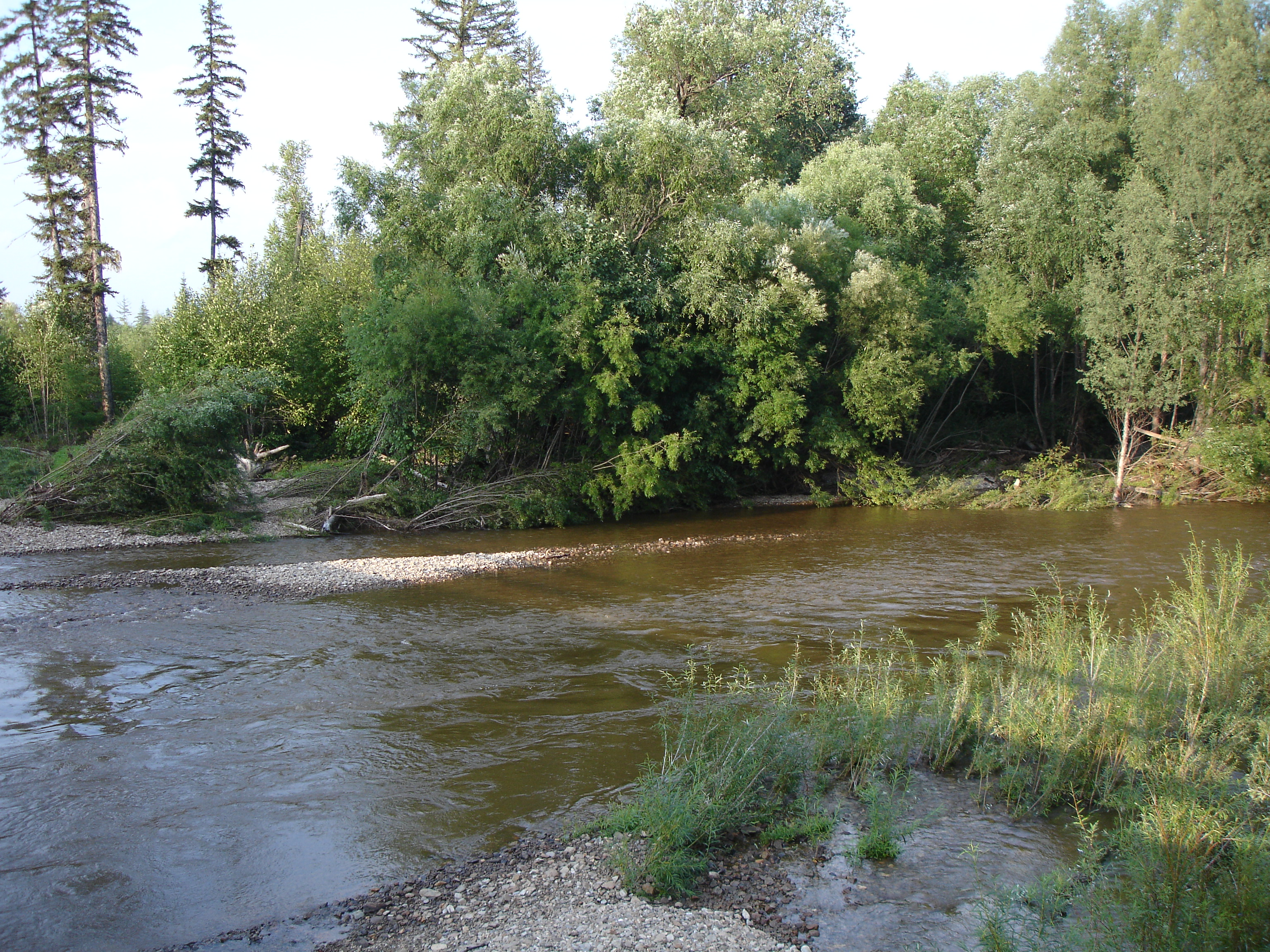
- East Siberian taiga in the north of Khabarovsk Krai

- The East Siberian taiga in Siberia

Ecology
- Realm: Palearctic
- Biome: Taiga

Geography
- Area: 3,900,000 km^{2} (1,500,000 mi^{2})

The East Siberian taiga ecoregion, in the taiga and boreal forests biome, is a very large biogeographic region in eastern Russia.

== Setting ==
This vast ecoregion is located in the heart of Siberia, stretching over 20° of latitude and 50° of longitude (52° to 72° N, and 80° to 130° E). The climate in the East Siberian taiga is subarctic (the trees growing there are coniferous and deciduous) and displays high continentality, with extremes ranging from 40 °C (104 °F) to −65 °C (−85 °F) and possibly lower. Winters are long and very cold, but dry, with little snowfall due to the effects of the Siberian anticyclone. Summers are short, but can be quite warm for the northerly location.

Precipitation is low, ranging from 200 to 600 millimetres (8 to 24 in), decreasing from east to west. The topography of this ecoregion is varied, consisting of wide, flat plains and areas of karst topography. In contrast to the neighbouring West Siberian taiga, large bogs and wetlands are conspicuously absent. Some trees also shed their leaves annually, a characteristic of deciduous forests.

== Flora ==
Vegetation consists mainly of vast, dense forests of Dahurian larch (Larix gmelinii), with Siberian larch (Larix sibirica) and hybrids between the Dahurian and Siberian larches (Larix × czekanowskii) occurring as one moves to the west. Cranberry (Vaccinium oxycoccus) and bilberry (Vaccinium myrtillus) bushes dominate the understory.

Throughout the ecoregion, smaller areas dominated by Siberian pine (Pinus sibirica), Scots pine (Pinus sylvestris), Siberian spruce (Picea obovata) and Siberian fir (Abies sibirica) can be found. Pine forests and deciduous forests composed of birch and poplar species become more common as one moves south, and at the headwaters of the Lena River and the Nizhnyaya Tunguska River, as well as in the Angara River basin, steppe and shrub-steppe communities can be found along with areas of forest-steppe.

== Fauna ==
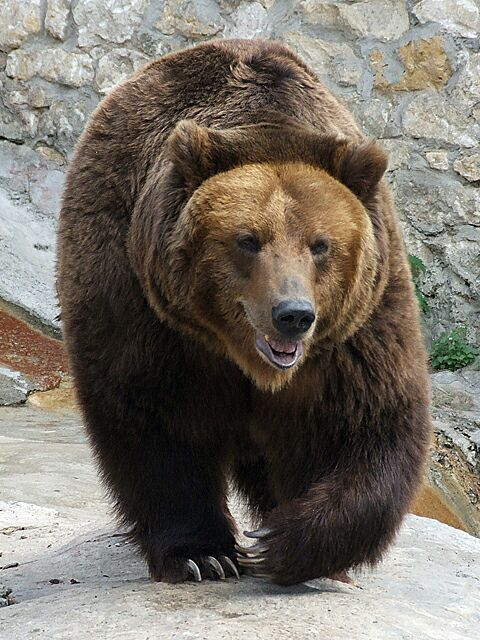
Brown bear

This region contains the highest number of brown bears (Ursus arctos collaris), Eurasian wolves (Canis lupus), moose (Alces alces) and wild reindeer (Rangifer tarandus) in Russia. Further south mammals in the East Siberian taiga include Siberian musk deer (Moschus moschiferus), Altai wapiti also known as Asian elk (Cervus canadensis sibiricus) and wild boar (Sus scrofa). Birds of this ecoregion include the golden eagle (Aquila chrysaetos), peregrine falcon (Falco peregrinus), osprey (Pandion haliaetus), hazel grouse (Tetrastes bonasia), Siberian grouse (Falcipennis falcipennis), black grouse (Lyrurus tetrix), western capercaillie (Tetrao urogallus), black-billed capercaillie (Tetrao parvirostris), willow ptarmigan (Lagopus lagopus), rock ptarmigan (Lagopus muta), black stork (Ciconia nigra), hooded crane (Grus monacha), carrion crow (Corvus corone), the Siberian blue and rufous-tailed robins (Luscinia cyane and L. sibilans, respectively), the thrush nightingale (Luscinia luscinia), Pallas's rosefinch (Carpodacus roseus), Pacific swift (Apus pacificus), common goldeneye (Bucephala clangula), smew (Mergellus albellus), king eider (Somateria spectabilis), spectacled eider (Somateria fischeri) and Baikal teal (Anas formosa).

== Conservation Status, threats and protected areas ==
Although little of this ecoregion is protected, its conservation status is listed as "Relatively Stable/Intact". Protected areas in this ecoregion include:

- Stolby Nature Sanctuary
- Olyokma Nature Reserve
- Tunguska Nature Reserve
- Central Siberia Nature Reserve

All are "Zapovedniks", (that is, strict ecological reserves). The main threats to this ecoregion's integrity are poaching and clear-cut logging in the southern and central portions of the region.

After the collapse of the Soviet Union, came a new threat. There is little forest in China, and Chinese entrepreneurs (due to the lack of woods, and fuelled by strong economic growth), began to show interest in obtaining the woods from RF. High levels of corruption and some other reasons allowed them to achieve their goal. A new law adopted was Federal law 473-FZ, which protects the rights of foreign companies in RF, and Chinese lumberjacks began to destroy all the trees on the leased land (and far beyond too). There have been numerous attempts of deforestation in the protected floodplain of the rivers. Because of the large environmental damage, their activities caused protests by local residents and the World Wide Fund for Nature. The actions of the Chinese companies pose a threat to the native population of Siberia and the Far East (Evenks, Udege et al.), depriving them of their habitat and traditional ways of life. Total deforestation by Chinese companies creates an additional threat to rare and endangered species such as the Siberian tiger, Amur leopard, East Siberian brown bear, among others.

== See also ==
- Tunguska event
- Taiga
