= 2005 NB56 =

Near-Earth asteroid

2005 NB_{56}
Discovery
- Discovered by: Mount Lemmon Survey
- Discovery site: Summerhaven, Arizona, US
- Discovery date: 11 July 2005

Designations
- Minor planet category: Apollo ; NEO

Orbital characteristics
- Epoch 21 November 2025 (JD 2461000.5)
- Uncertainty parameter 0
- Observation arc: 6,808 d (18.64 yr)
- Aphelion: 2.41907 AU (361.888 Gm)
- Perihelion: 0.86615 AU (129.574 Gm)
- Semi-major axis: 1.64261 AU (245.731 Gm)
- Eccentricity: 0.47270
- Orbital period (sidereal): 2.11 yr (768.95 d)
- Mean anomaly: 266.58°
- Mean motion: 0° 28^{m} 5.412^{s} /day
- Inclination: 6.7671°
- Longitude of ascending node: 112.109°
- Argument of perihelion: 114.48°
- Earth MOID: 0.0154071 AU (2,304,870 km)
- Jupiter MOID: 2.58553 AU (386.790 Gm)

Physical characteristics
- Mean diameter: ~170 m
- Absolute magnitude (H): 23.33

2005 NB_{56} is a near-Earth asteroid of the Apollo group. In 2009, research physicist Edward Drobyshevski and colleagues have suggested that 2005 NB_{56} could be a possible source of the meteoroid that caused the Tunguska event on 30 June 1908. It has been also suspected to be a dormant comet.

== Possible source of the Tunguska event bolide ==
One study "suggests that a chunk of a comet caused the 5-10 megaton fireball, bouncing off the atmosphere and back into orbit around the sun."

This object made a close approach to Earth when it was discovered in 2005 and will do so again in 2045. This object had a poorly known orbit and was only observed over an observation arc of 17 days when it was discovered in 2005, not sufficient to predict its position in 1908 with sufficient accuracy.
