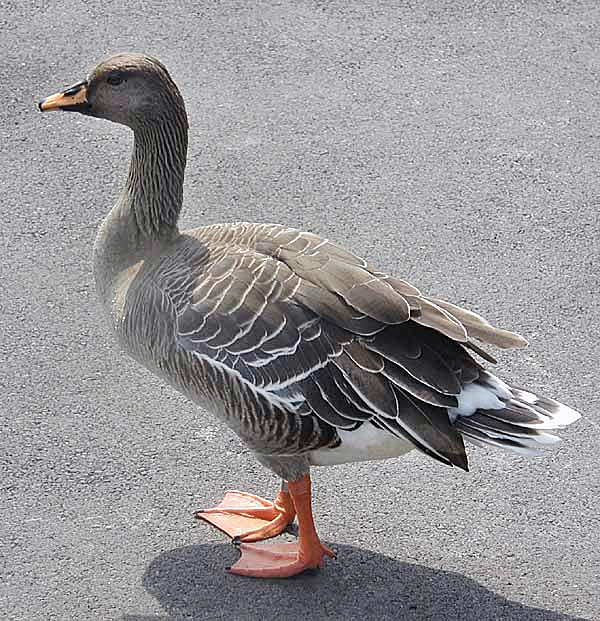
- Taiga bean goose (A. fabalis) at Slimbridge Wildfowl and Wetlands Centre, Gloucestershire, England

Conservation status
- Least Concern (IUCN 3.1)

Scientific classification
- Kingdom: Animalia
- Phylum: Chordata
- Class: Aves
- Order: Anseriformes
- Family: Anatidae
- Genus: Anser
- Species complex: Bean goose species complex

Species
- Taiga bean goose (Anser fabalis); Tundra bean goose (Anser serrirostris); Pink-footed goose (Anser brachyrhynchus)

= Bean goose =

Species complex of birds

The bean goose is a species complex of goose that breeds in northern Europe and Eurosiberia. It has at least two distinct taxa, one inhabiting taiga habitats (The Taiga bean goose, Anser fabalis) and one inhabiting tundra (The Tundra bean goose, Anser serrirostris). These are recognised as separate species by the American Ornithologists' Union and the IOC, but are considered a single species by other authorities. The related pink-footed goose (Anser brachyrhynchus) has also been included in the species complex. It is migratory and winters further south in Europe and Asia.

== Description ==
The length ranges from 68 to 90 cm (27–35 in) "RSPB's Taiga Bean Goose" wingspan from 140 to 174 cm (55–69 in) and weight from 1.7–4 kg (3.7–8.8 lb). In the nominate subspecies, males average 3.2 kg (7.1 lb) and females average 2.84 kg (6.3 lb). The bill is black at the base and tip, with an orange band across the middle; the legs and feet are also bright orange.

The upper wing-coverts are dark brown, as in the white-fronted goose (Anser albifrons) and the lesser white-fronted goose (A. erythropus), but differing from these in having narrow white fringes to the feathers.

The voice is a loud honking, higher pitched in the smaller subspecies.

The closely related pink-footed goose (A. brachyrhynchus) has the bill short, bright pink in the middle, and the feet also pink, the upper wing-coverts being nearly of the same bluish-grey as in the greylag goose. In size and bill structure, it is very similar to Anser fabalis rossicus, and in the past was often treated as a sixth subspecies of bean goose.

== Reproduction ==
Bean goose mate for life, and they usually select their mates in the second winter of their lives. Bean goose use courtship to find mates, including a display of tail feathers. Once they choose their mates, they get together, put their heads close together, and sing to each other. This usually happens when a male chases off another male. This is performed throughout the bird's lifetime.

They breed yearly and raise young together. Bean geese typically lay 4 to 6 eggs which are incubated for 27 to 29 days. Bean geese reach sexual maturity at three years.

== Taxonomy ==
The English and scientific names of the bean goose come from its habit in the past of grazing in bean field stubbles in winter. Anser is the Latin for "goose", and fabalis is derived from the Latin faba, a broad bean.

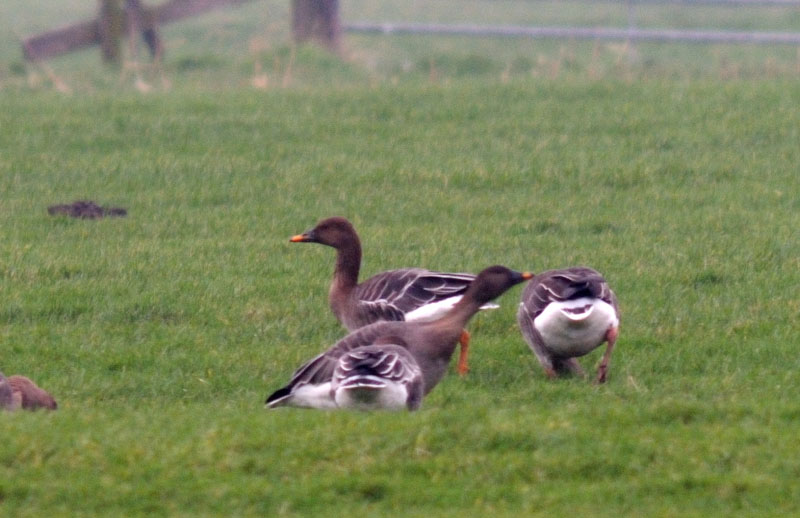
Taiga bean goose (Anser fabalis sensu stricto) on background, tundra bean goose (Anser serrirostris) on foreground and greylag goose (Anser anser) on the right, at Spaarndam, North Holland, the Netherlands

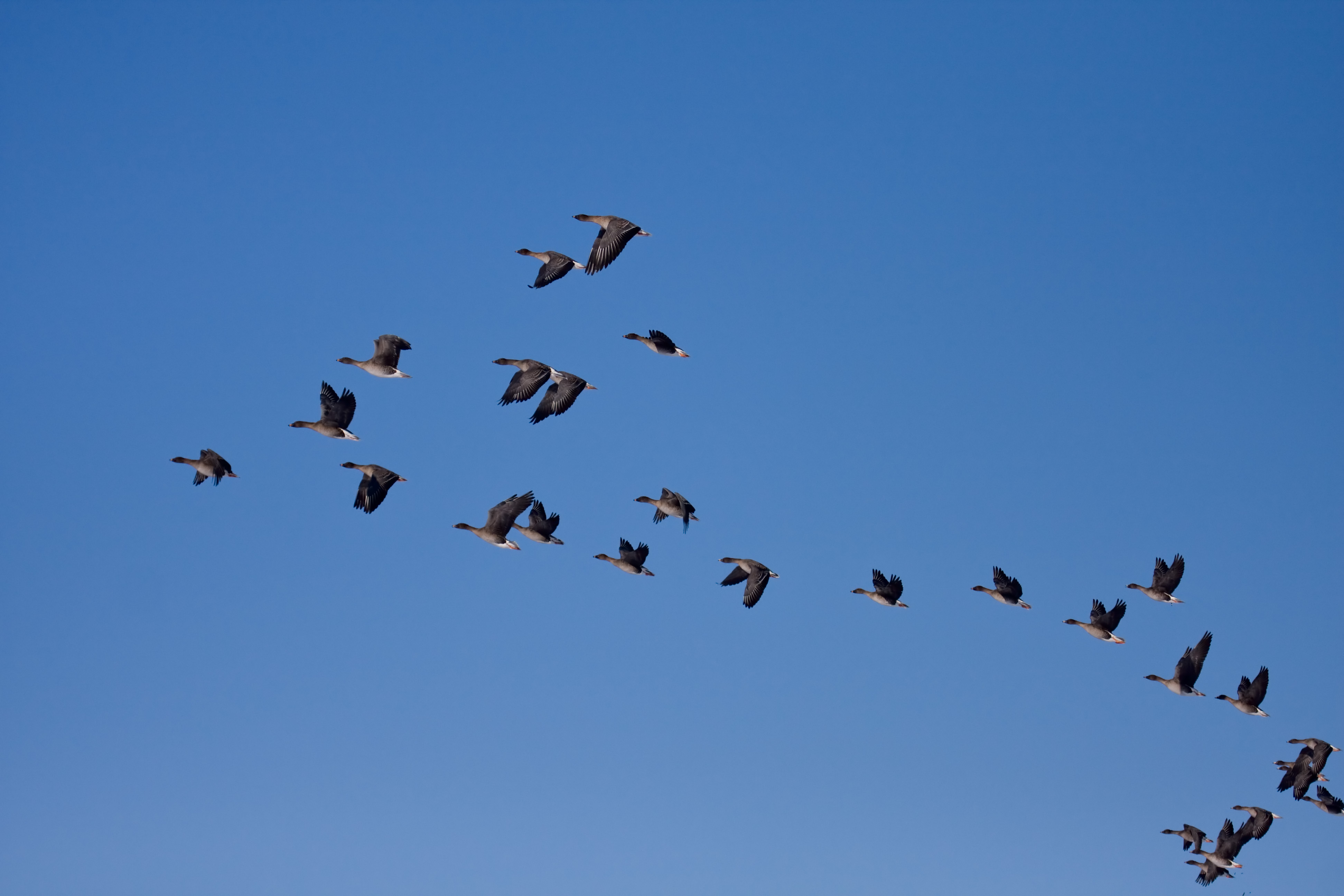
A flock of tundra bean geese

The species complex comprises the closely related taiga bean goose (Anser fabalis) and tundra bean goose (Anser serrirostris). Together, they contain five subspecies, with complex variation in body size and bill size and pattern. Generally, size increases from north to south and from west to east. Some ornithologists (including AOU 2007) split them into two species based on breeding habitat, whether in forest bogs in the subarctic taiga, or on the arctic tundra. The taiga and tundra bean goose diverged about 2.5 million years ago and established secondary contact ca. 60,000 years ago, resulting in extensive gene flow. Their subspecies have been treated by some authors as all belonging to a single species, Anser fabalis. The related pink-footed goose (Anser brachyrhynchus) has also been included in the species complex, with a 2023 study recovering it as the sister taxon to A. fabalis, and A. serrirostris as the sister taxon to the two of them. The complex has included several contested species including Sushkin's goose (Anser neglectus).

Taiga bean goose (Anser fabalis sensu stricto) (Latham, 1787)

- A. f. fabalis (Latham, 1787). Scandinavia east to the Urals. Large; bill long and narrow, with broad orange band. Anser fabalis fabalis is one of the species to which the Agreement on the Conservation of African-Eurasian Migratory Waterbirds (AEWA) applies.
- A. f. johanseni (Delacour, 1951). West Siberian taiga. Large; bill long and narrow, with narrow orange band.
- A. f. middendorffii (Severtzov, 1873). East Siberian taiga. Very large; bill long and stout, with narrow orange band.

Tundra bean goose (Anser serrirostris, if treated as a distinct species) (Gould, 1852)

- A. s. rossicus (Buturlin, 1933). Northern Russian tundra east to the Taimyr Peninsula. Small; bill short and stubby, with narrow orange band. Anser fabalis rossicus is one of the species to which the Agreement on the Conservation of African-Eurasian Migratory Waterbirds (AEWA) applies.
- A. s. serrirostris (Gould, 1852). East Siberian tundra. Large; bill long and stout, with narrow orange band.

== Distribution ==
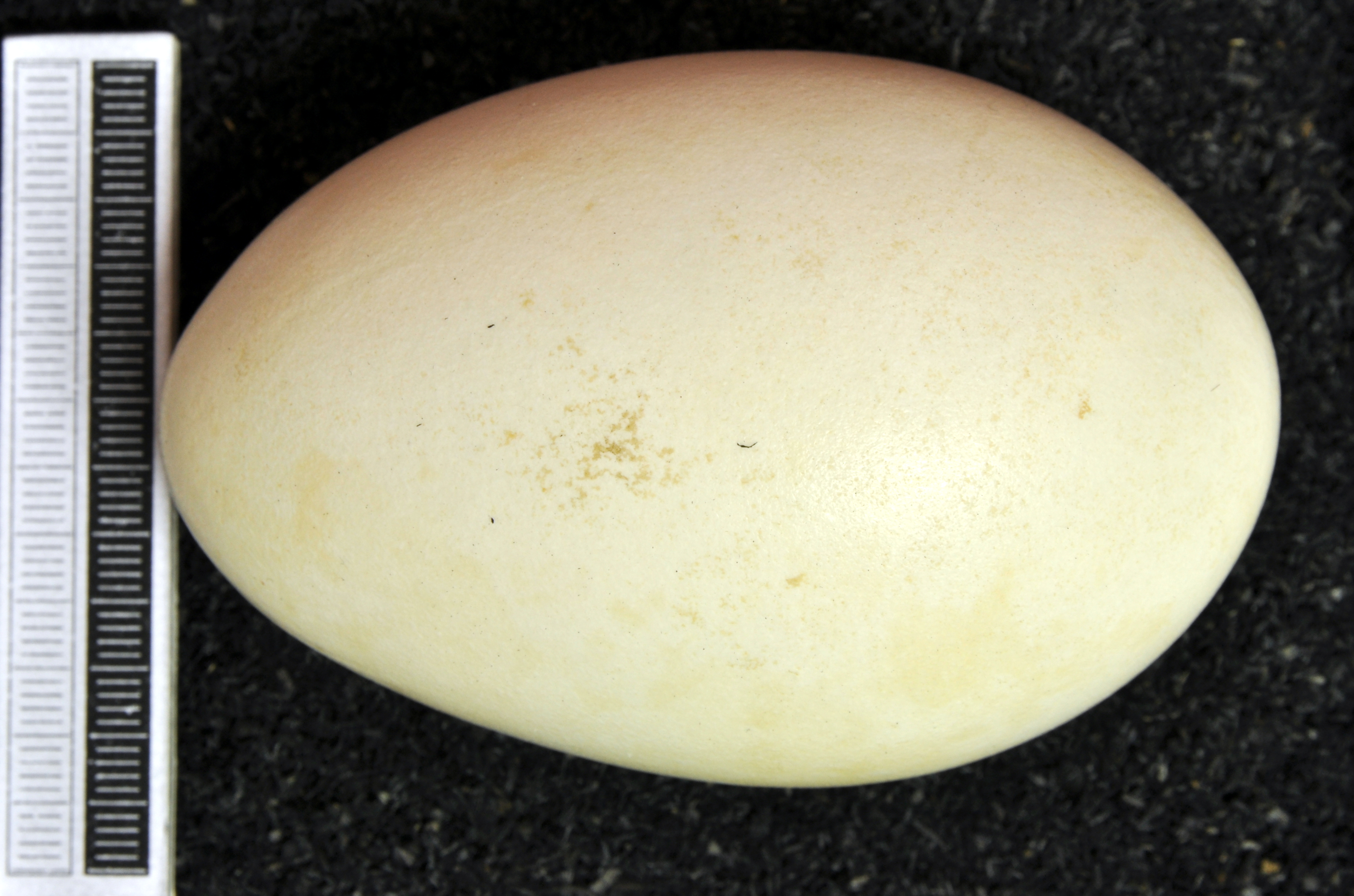
Egg, Collection Museum Wiesbaden

The bean goose is a rare winter visitor to Britain. There are two regular wintering flocks of taiga bean goose, in the valley of the River Yare, Norfolk and the Avon Valley, Scotland. A formerly regular flock in Dumfries and Galloway no longer occurs there. The tundra bean goose has no regular wintering sites, but is found in small groups among other grey goose species – among the most regular localities are WWT Slimbridge, Gloucestershire and Holkham Marshes, Norfolk.

The Taiga bean geese Anser fabalis fabalis wintering in Europe are considered to migrate across three different flyways: Western, Central and Eastern; which has been confirmed by stable isotope analysis of their flight feathers.
