= Aldo Vannucchi =

Brazilian educator

- Born: September 24, 1928 (age 97); São João da Boa Vista, São Paulo, Brazil
- Occupation: Educator
- Known for: Former Rector of the University of Sorocaba (UNISO)
- Spouse: Rosalia Cortez Vannucchi
- Children: João Estêvão Cortez Vannucchi, Ana Maria Cortez Vannucchi

Aldo Vannucchi (born 24 September 1928) is an educator from Sorocaba, Brazil, former rector of the University of Sorocaba UNISO.

He was born in São João da Boa Vista, São Paulo, the son of Elvira Betiole and José Vannucchi. In 1932, as a child, his family moved to Sorocaba. In 1952 he was ordained priest by Don Aguirre, the first Diocesan Bishop of Sorocaba, one of the founders of the Faculty of Philosophy, Sciences and Letters, which had been a great inspiration in his life. He said the big lesson learned in 20 years of priesthood was that the true Church is the Church of the people, covering all but it has to be built from the reality of the mass of the people.

At the time of the military regime in Brazil, Aldo Vannucchi was arrested for a night, based on false accusations and due to his involvement with the working class. His release came after intervention by the Brazilian clergy. Alexandre Vannucchi Leme, his nephew, student of geology at the University of São Paulo - USP is arrested, tortured and murdered by the military, thus becoming one of the martyrs of the struggle by the end of military rule.

Requested dismissal of the clergy in 1963. He married Rosalia Cortez Vannucchi and have two sons João Estêvão Cortez Vannucchi e Ana Maria Cortez Vannucchi. He devoted himself exclusively to teaching, and as director and professor of Philosophy in schools and colleges of Sorocaba. In 1988, engaged in the struggle for the creation of the University of Sorocaba (UNISO), recognized in September 1994 and he was rector until 2010.

He is Master of Science in theology and Philosophy, with several specialized courses at universities in Rome, Geneva and Louvain in Belgium, it is also the author more than a dozen books and translator of many others. He was president of ABRUC (Brazilian Association of Community Universities), an organization that brings together about 50 community colleges in existence in Brazil. Aldo Vanucchi was also chosen by the minister of Education to form the National Council of Education in Brazil.
