= Vanavara (rural locality) =

Russian rural locality

Vanavara Ванавара Анавар
- Selo
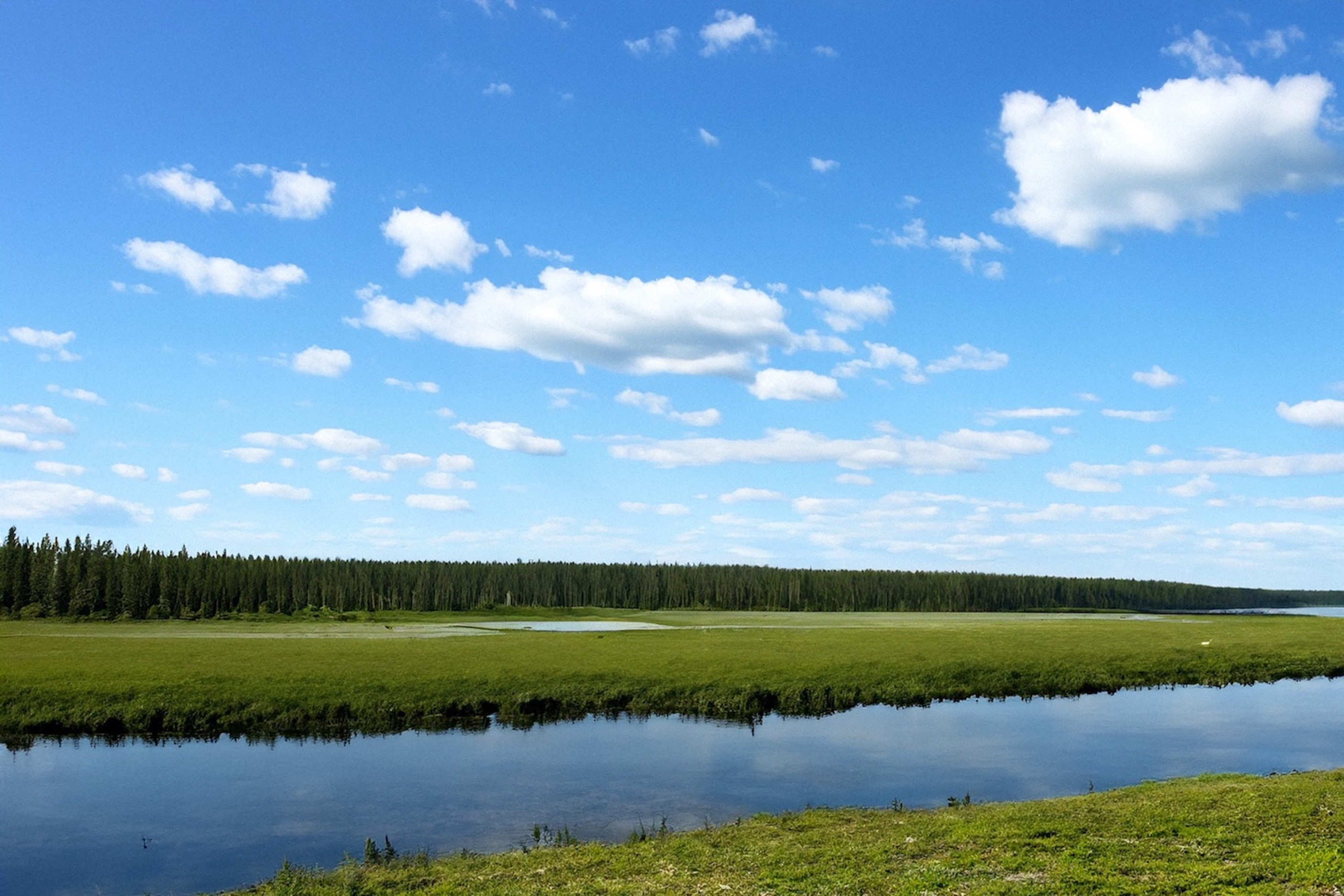
- Vanavarka River
- Interactive map of Vanavara
- Location of Vanavara Vanavara (Krasnoyarsk Krai)
- Coordinates: 60°20′40″N 102°17′00″E
- Country: Russia
- Federal subject: Krasnoyarsk Krai
- Founded: 1932

Population (2010 Census)
  - Total: 3,153
  - Estimate (2025): 2,532 (−19.7%)

Administrative status
  - Subordinated to: Evenkiysky District
- Time zone: UTC+7 (MSK+4)
- Postal code: 648490
- OKTMO ID: 04650459101

Vanavara (Russian: Ванава́ра) is a rural locality (a selo) in Evenkiysky District of Krasnoyarsk Krai, Russia, located on the Podkamennaya Tunguska River at the mouth of the local Vanavarka River. Population: 3,153 (2010 census); 3,313 (2002 census); 5,697 (1989 Soviet census).

Vanavara is notable for being the nearest populated place to the site of the 1908 Tunguska event.

== History ==
The locality, also occasionally named Anavar (Анавар), as it exists today was founded in 1932 as a base for herders, hunters, and fishermen, as well as a location for a weather station.

A plane crash occurred on September 26, 1994, when a plane flying from Krasnoyarsk to Tura had diverted to Vanavara Airport due to bad weather: on running out of fuel the crew then attempted an emergency landing on the bank of the Chamba River 41 km from Vanavara centre. All twenty-four passengers and four crew died in the crash.

On December 10, 2010, an explosion occurred in a boiler in the heating plant in Vanavara. A fireman was killed in the incident and heating was cut off for 720 houses, forcing the temporary evacuation of many children to Krasnoyarsk.

== Transportation ==
The locality is served by Vanavara Airport.

== Climate ==
Vanavara has a subarctic climate (Köppen climate classification Dfc). Winters are severely cold with average temperature -27.9 °C (-18.2 °F) in January, while summers are warm enough with average temperature 18.1 °C (64.6 °F) in July. Precipitation is moderate and is somewhat higher in summer than at other times of the year.

Climate data for Vanavara
Month	Jan	Feb	Mar	Apr	May	Jun	Jul	Aug	Sep	Oct	Nov	Dec	Year
Record high °C (°F)	1.0 (33.8)	5.3 (41.5)	13.8 (56.8)	25.3 (77.5)	33.9 (93.0)	35.7 (96.3)	36.0 (96.8)	34.8 (94.6)	29.6 (85.3)	19.2 (66.6)	6.9 (44.4)	1.7 (35.1)	36.0 (96.8)
Mean daily maximum °C (°F)	−22.0 (−7.6)	−15.0 (5.0)	−4.2 (24.4)	4.7 (40.5)	13.3 (55.9)	22.8 (73.0)	25.4 (77.7)	21.3 (70.3)	11.8 (53.2)	0.8 (33.4)	−13.0 (8.6)	−22.1 (−7.8)	2.0 (35.6)
Daily mean °C (°F)	−27.9 (−18.2)	−23.4 (−10.1)	−12.7 (9.1)	−2.1 (28.2)	6.5 (43.7)	15.4 (59.7)	18.1 (64.6)	14.2 (57.6)	5.7 (42.3)	−3.5 (25.7)	−18.6 (−1.5)	−27.3 (−17.1)	−4.6 (23.7)
Mean daily minimum °C (°F)	−33.4 (−28.1)	−30.9 (−23.6)	−21.5 (−6.7)	−9.3 (15.3)	−0.3 (31.5)	7.4 (45.3)	10.5 (50.9)	7.2 (45.0)	0.6 (33.1)	−7.6 (18.3)	−24.1 (−11.4)	−32.5 (−26.5)	−11.2 (11.9)
Record low °C (°F)	−61.0 (−77.8)	−57.7 (−71.9)	−50.3 (−58.5)	−39.0 (−38.2)	−26.4 (−15.5)	−6.2 (20.8)	−3.0 (26.6)	−5.9 (21.4)	−16.2 (2.8)	−39.2 (−38.6)	−54.5 (−66.1)	−58.2 (−72.8)	−61.0 (−77.8)
Average precipitation mm (inches)	20 (0.8)	15 (0.6)	16 (0.6)	26 (1.0)	37 (1.5)	53 (2.1)	48 (1.9)	51 (2.0)	46 (1.8)	42 (1.7)	33 (1.3)	24 (0.9)	411 (16.2)
Average snowfall cm (inches)	46 (18)	53 (21)	54 (21)	41 (16)	4 (1.6)	0 (0)	0 (0)	0 (0)	0 (0)	5 (2.0)	21 (8.3)	35 (14)	259 (101.9)
Average rainy days	0	0	1	8	17	17	15	16	16	10	1	0	101
Average snowy days	25	21	17	11	8	1	0	0	4	21	25	25	158
Average relative humidity (%)	77	74	66	60	57	62	66	73	75	78	79	78	70
Mean monthly sunshine hours	54	119	186	226	245	288	295	216	142	86	62	27	1,946
Source 1: pogoda.ru.net
Source 2: NOAA (sun only, 1961-1990)
