= Jacques Van Impe =

Belgian ornithologist

Jacques Van Impe (born 15 January 1941) is a Belgian academic widely published in the field of ornithology. His research is particularly focused on reproduction in the greater white-fronted goose, the bean goose (Anser fabalis rossicus), the Eurasian oystercatcher, the pied avocet, the northern lapwing, the black-tailed godwit, and the common redshank.

== Select recent publications ==
- "Changements importants dans la distribution des Oies sauvages (Anser sp. et Branta sp.) dans le Nord de la Russie européenne." (Important changes in the breeding range of wild geese (Anser sp. and Branta sp.) in the North of European Russia) Alauda 76(1): 11–22. 2008.
- "Pollution par un fioul léger dans le Bas-Escaut (Zélande, Pays-Bas): son effet sur les comportements et les activités d'une population d'Oies cendrées Anser anser." (Light fuel oil spill on the Lower Scheldt (Zeeland, The Netherlands): its effect on the behaviour of a greylag flock) Alauda 75(2): 119–128. 2007.
- "Über das einstmals sehr zahlreiche Vorkommen der Elfenbeinmöwe Pagophila eburnea in der südlichen Barentssee." (On the past numerous occurrence of the ivory gull in the southern parts of the Barents Sea) Ornithologische Mitteilungen. 59(9): 288–294. 2007.
- (with Voet, H. & P. Maes.) "Slagpenrui bij de Geoorde Fuut Podiceps nigricollis in het Antwerpse." (Wing moult in the black-necked grebe in the Antwerp area) Natuur.Oriolus 72(3): 73–79. 2006.
- "Über die Ursachen der Ausbreitung des Brutgebiets der Schwarzkopfmöwe Larus melanocephalus in Europa." (On the causes of the breeding range expansion of the Mediterranean gull in Europe) Ornithol. Mitt. 57(3): 83–92. 2005.
- "Brütet die Steppenkragentrappe Chlamydotis macqueenii noch in Europa? Eine Literaturübersicht." (Is MacQueen's bustard still breeding in Europe? A literature review) Ornithol. Mitt. 56(4): 134–138. 2004.
- "Voortplantingssucces van Kievit, Vanellus vanellus, Grutto Limosa limosa en Tureluur Tringa totanus te Antwerpen-Linkeroever." (Reproduction success of lapwing, black-tailed godwit and redshank at the left bank of the river Schelde near Antwerp) Natuur.Oriolus 69(2): 45–59. 2003.
- "Een broedgeval van een paar Zwartkopmeeuwen Larus melanocephalus in eerste zomerkleed." (A breeding record of the Mediterranean gull in first-summer plumage.) Oriolus 67(1): 1-2. 2001.
- "Een vergeten broedgeval van de Kleine Rietgans Anser brachyrhynchus op het Europese Continent." (A forgotten breeding record of the pink-footed goose on the European Continent) Oriolus 66(4): 129-131. 2000.
- "Grauwe Gans Anser anser en Kolgans Anser albifrons in de bedreigde Scheldepolders bij Doel: aantallen en interpecifieke relaties." (Greylag goose and white-fronted goose in the claimed polders of the river Scheldt near Doel: numbers and interspecific relationships) Oriolus 65(3): 93–108. 1999.
