= Vannucci =

Vannucci is a surname. Notable people with the surname include:

- Atto Vannucci (1810–1883), Italian historian, patriot and politician
- Chiara Vannucci (born 1993) Italian racing cyclist
- Damiano Vannucci (born 1977), Sanmarinese footballer
- Marina Vannucci (born 1966), Italian statistician
- Olivier Vannucci (born 1991), French footballer
- Pietro Vannucci (c. 1446/52–1523), known as Pietro Perugino, 15th-16th-century Italian Renaissance painter, master of Raphael
- Ronnie Vannucci Jr. (born 1976), American rock drummer for the Killers
- Valdo Vannucci (born 1947), Italian politician and professor
