= Paola Vannucchi =

Italian geologist

Paola Vannucchi is an Italian geologist specializing in tectonics and marine geology, including the balance of accretion and erosion in subduction zones. She is Professor in Tectonics and Structural Geology at the University of Florence, and the former president of the European Geosciences Union Division on Tectonics and Structural Geology.

== Education and career ==
Vannucchi earned a laurea (then the equivalent of a combined bachelor's and master's degree) in geology from the University of Florence in 1993, with her studies also including a student visit to the University of California, Santa Cruz (UCSC). She continued visiting UCSC while working as a doctoral student in earth sciences in a combined program through the University of Bologna and University of Modena and Reggio Emilia, which she completed in 1998.

After postdoctoral research at the University of Wales (Aberystwyth), she became a research scientist at the University of Modena and Reggio Emilia from 1999 to 2003, and at the University of Florence from 2003 to 2020. Meanwhile, she was a lecturer at the University of Modena and Reggio Emilia from 2005 to 2007. She became a senior lecturer in marine science and tectonics at Royal Holloway, University of London in 2012, became reader in 2015, and was made full professor in 2017. In 2020 she returned to the University of Florence with her current professorship, in tectonics and structural geology.

== Recognition ==
Vannucchi became a Fellow of the Geological Society of London in 2000. She received the Arne Richter Outstanding Young Scientist Award of the European Geosciences Union in 2004. She was a distinguished lecturer of the International Ocean Discovery Program (Italy) in 2005–2006, and of the European Consortium for Oceanic Research Drilling in 2014–2015. She became a Humboldt Research Fellow in 2024.
