= Petr Sushkin =

Russian ornithologist (1868–1928)

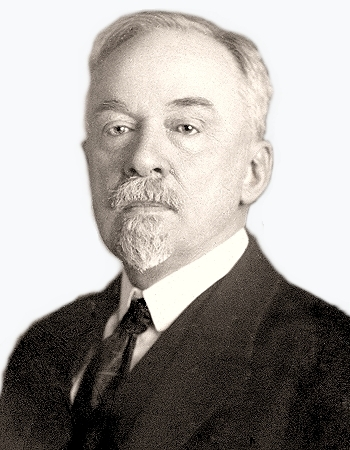
Sushkin in 1920

Petr Petrovich Sushkin (Russian: Петр Петрович Сушкин; 27 January 1868 – 17 September 1928) was a Russian and Soviet based ornithologist who specialised on comparative anatomy, and evolution of birds, particularly of the birds of prey.

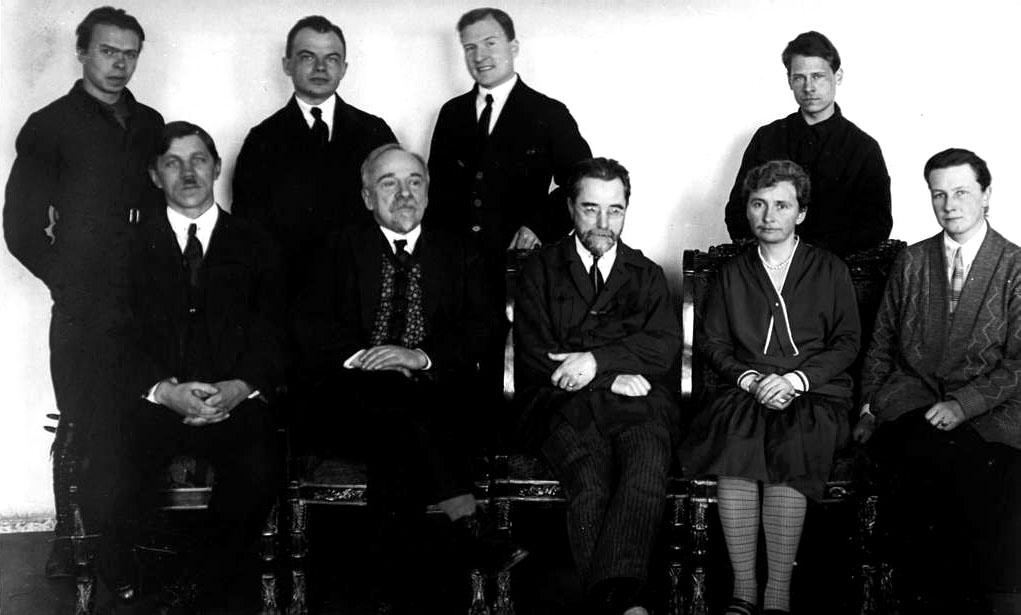
Sushkin (seated second from left) and his wife Nadezhna (seated fourth from left) with other Soviet ornithologists, 1924

Sushkin was born in Tula, Russia, in a merchant family. He studied at the Tula Classical Gymnasium (1877-1885) graduating with a silver medal before going on to Moscow University in 1885. He graduated in 1890 and joined the staff of the Leningrad Zoological Museum in 1898. He studied ornithology under Mikhail Menzbier and his dissertation in 1897 was on the morphology of the skeleton of birds, specifically of the kestrel. He conducted surveys in the Ufa province in 1891 and Kazakhstan in 1898. His studies on the birds of southeastern Russia, Siberia and the Altai Mountains were published in several monographs. Sushkin visited European museums from 1899 to 1900 and worked on his doctoral dissertation on the birds of prey. He became a professor at Moscow University and in 1909 became a professor at Kharkov University teaching until 1919. In 1913, he surveyed the Transcaucasian region. From 1919 to 1920 he taught at the Tauride University, Simferopol. He published in English, German, and Russian, and wrote Notes on systematics and distribution of certain palaearctic birds, an influential article on bird relationships.

In 1916, Sushkin was among the founders of the Russian Palaeontological Society. In 1923 he became a member of the USSR Academy of Sciences and in 1924 he was made an honorary member of the British Ornithological Union.

Sushkin died of pneumonia at Kislovodsk and is buried at the Smolensky cemetery in Leningrad. He had one daughter from his first wife Anna Ivanovna née Kulakova and had no children from his second wife Nadezhna Nikolaevna née Popova.
