= Podkamennaya Tunguska =

Podkamennaya Tunguska Stony Tunguska
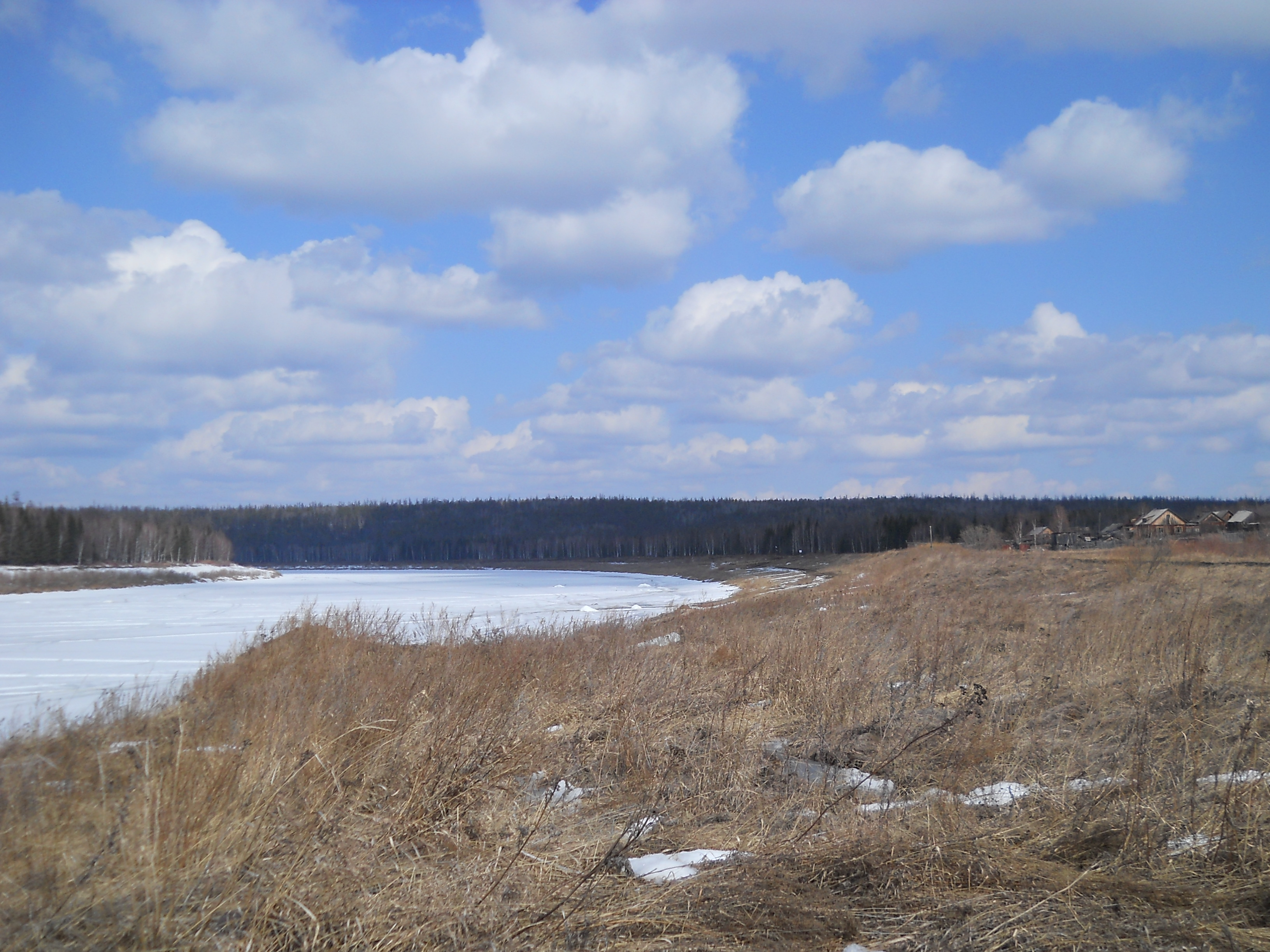

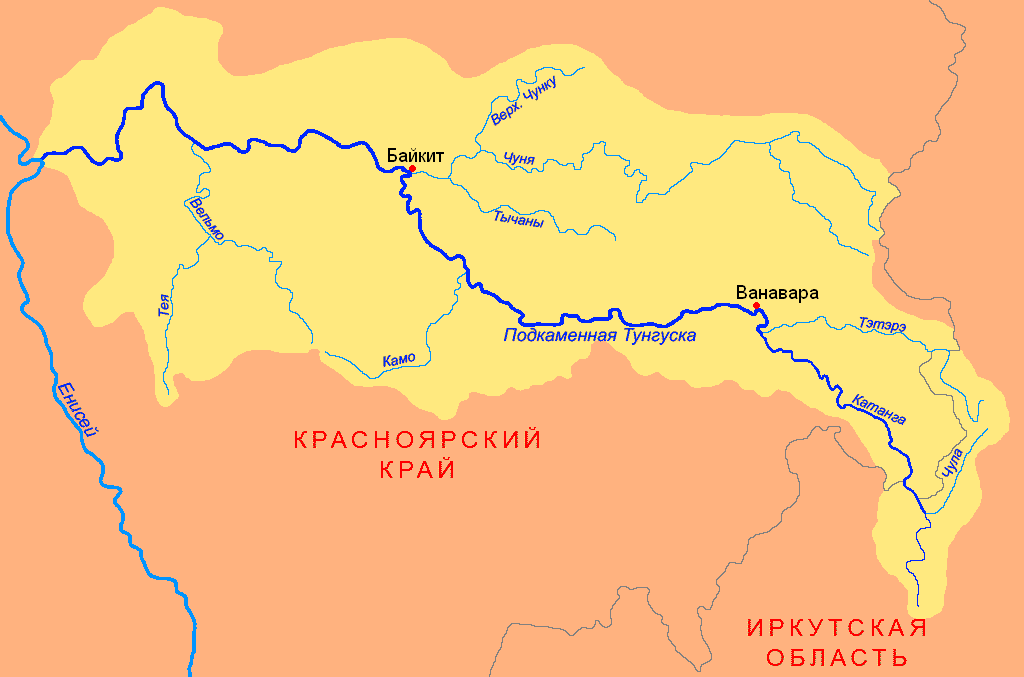
- Map of the Podkamennaya Tunguska basin

Location
- Country: Russia
- State: Krasnoyarsk Krai, Irkutsk Oblast

Physical characteristics
- Source: Angara Range
  - location: near Rudnogorsk, Irkutsk Oblast
  - coordinates: 57°41′46″N 104°20′20″E
  - elevation: 514 m (1,686 ft)
- Mouth: Yenisey
  - location: Podkamennaya Tunguska, Krasnoyarsk Krai
  - coordinates: 61°35′40″N 90°08′00″E
  - elevation: 28 m (92 ft)
- Length: 1,865 km (1,159 mi)
- Basin size: 240,000 km^{2} (93,000 sq mi)
- Discharge
  - average: 1,750 m^{3}/s (62,000 cu ft/s)

Basin features
- Progression: Yenisey→ Kara Sea

The Podkamennaya Tunguska (Russian: Подкаменная Тунгуска, literally Tunguska under the stones; Evenki: Дулгу Катэнӈа, Ket: Ӄо’ль) also known as Middle Tunguska or Stony Tunguska, is a river in Krasnoyarsk Krai, Russia.

== History ==
In 1908, an asteroid impacted near the river and later became known as the Tunguska event.

== Hydrology ==
The river's nutrition is mainly snow (60%); rain and groundwater nutrition account for 16 and 24%, respectively. The flood lasts from the beginning of May to the end of June, in the lower reaches until the beginning of July. From July to October, there is a summer low, interrupted by a rise in the level to 5.5 m during floods, which can be from one to four per year. The average annual water consumption at the mouth is 1587.18 m^{3}/s, during summer floods it reaches 35,000 m^{3}/s. Ice phenomena have been occurring since mid-October, the autumn ice drift of 7–16 days is accompanied by the formation of ice jams.

The ice age lasts from the end of October to the middle of May. The ice drift lasts 5–7 days in the upper reaches and up to 10 days in the lower reaches, passes violently, with congestion the level rises by 29.7 m. Winter nutrition is weakened due to the location of the river basin in the permafrost zone and reaches the lowest values of 3–15 m^{3}/s, the total winter runoff is 11% of the annual.

== In popular culture ==
The river was the set location in the Call of Duty: Black Ops Escalation DLC map, Call of The Dead.

== See also ==
- List of rivers of Russia
