= Evenk constituency =

Russian legislative constituency

Evenk single-member constituency
- Constituency of the Russian State Duma

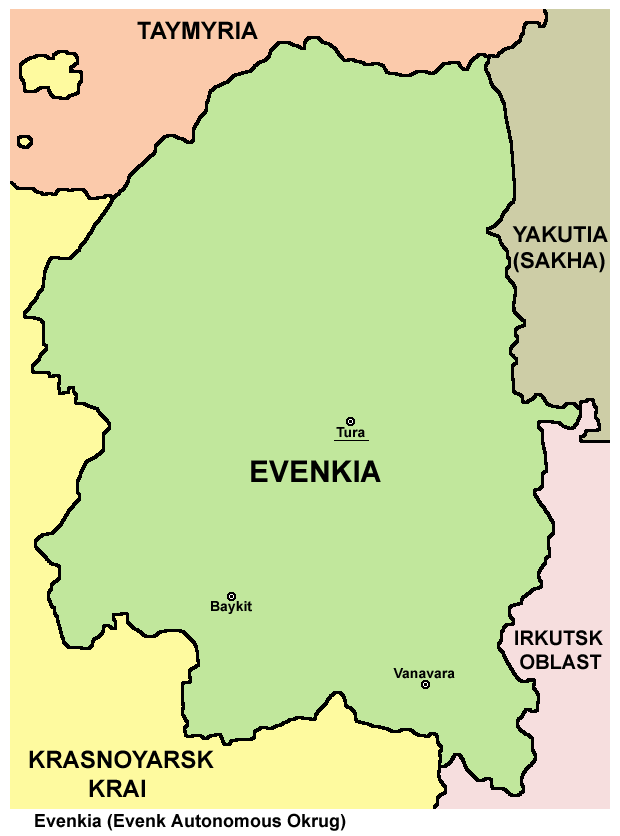
- Constituency boundaries from 1993 to 2007
- Deputy: None
- Federal subject: Evenk Autonomous Okrug
- Districts: Baykitsky, Ilimpiyskiy, Tungussko-Chunsky
- Voters: 13,258 (2003)

The Evenk constituency (No.224) was a Russian legislative constituency in the Evenk Autonomous Okrug in 1993–2007. It encompassed the entire territory of Evenk Autonomous Okrug. The seat was last occupied by United Russia deputy Oleg Stolyarov, a former Yukos executive, who won the open-seat race in the 2003 election.

The constituency was dissolved in 2007 when State Duma adopted full proportional representation for the next two electoral cycles. Earlier in 2007 Evenk Autonomous Okrug and neighbouring Taymyr Autonomous Okrug were merged with Krasnoyarsk Krai. Currently the territory of the former Evenk constituency is part of the Yeniseysk constituency.

== Boundaries ==
1993–2007: Baykitsky District, Ilimpiyskiy District, Tungussko-Chunsky District, Tura
The constituency had been covering the entirety of Evenk Autonomous Okrug since its initial creation in 1993.

== Members elected ==
| Election | Member | Party |
|---|---|---|
| 1993 | Viktor Gayulsky | Independent |
| 1995 | Viktor Gayulsky | Independent |
| 1999 | Gennady Druzhinin | Independent |
| 2003 | Oleg Stolyarov | United Russia |

== Election results ==
=== 1993 ===
==== Declared candidates ====
- Viktor Gayulsky (Independent), reindeer farm director
- Vladimir Kirillov (Independent), boiler room chief
- Yury Lykov (Independent), geophysical expedition chief
- Alitet Nemtushkin (Independent), writer, poet
- Aleksey Simonov (Independent), geophysicist
- Boris Stolyarov (Independent), Chairman of the Baykitsky District Council of People's Deputies (1990–1993)
- Sergey Takmakov (Independent), geologist
- Vladimir Uvachan (Independent), former People's Deputy of Russia (1990–1993), former First Secretary of the CPSU Evenk Okrug Committee (1986–1991)
- Ivan Yeldogir (Independent), sovkhoz director

==== Results ====
Summary of the 12 December 1993 Russian legislative election in the Evenk constituency
| Candidate | Party | Votes | % |
|---|---|---|---|
| Viktor Gayulsky | Independent | 1,150 | 15.04% |
| Vladimir Kirillov | Independent | – | – |
| Yury Lykov | Independent | – | – |
| Alitet Nemtushkin | Independent | – | – |
| Aleksey Simonov | Independent | – | – |
| Boris Stolyarov | Independent | – | – |
| Sergey Takmakov | Independent | – | – |
| Vladimir Uvachan | Independent | – | – |
| Ivan Yeldogir | Independent | – | – |
| Total | | 7,645 | 100% |

=== 1995 ===
==== Declared candidates ====
- Nikolay Anisimov (Independent), Member of Legislative Assembly (Suglan) of the Evenk Autonomous Okrug (1994–present), Deputy Head of Baykitsky District (1993–present)
- Viktor Gayulsky (Independent), incumbent Member of State Duma (1994–present)
- Nikolay Grishanov (Independent), agriculture businessman
- Igor Lavrikov (Independent), aide to State Duma member
- Alitet Nemtushkin (Independent), writer, poet, 1993 candidate for this seat
- Andrey Nikiforov (LDPR), party official
- Albert Shcherbachev (Independent), mobile mechanized column head
- Boris Stolyarov (Independent), former Chairman of the Baykitsky District Council of People's Deputies (1990–1993), 1993 candidate for this seat
- Sergey Uoday (Independent), research farm director
- Vladimir Uvachan (Independent), former People's Deputy of Russia (1990–1993), former First Secretary of the CPSU Evenk Okrug Committee (1986–1991), 1993 candidate for this seat

==== Results ====
Summary of the 17 December 1995 Russian legislative election in the Evenk constituency
| Candidate | Party | Votes | % |
|---|---|---|---|
| Viktor Gayulsky (incumbent) | Independent | 1,931 | 24.07% |
| Vladimir Uvachan | Independent | 1,377 | 17.17% |
| Sergey Uoday | Independent | 787 | 9.81% |
| Igor Lavrikov | Independent | 481 | 6.00% |
| Andrey Nikiforov | Liberal Democratic Party | 420 | 5.24% |
| Alitet Nemtushkin | Independent | 373 | 4.65% |
| Nikolay Anisimov | Independent | 353 | 4.40% |
| Nikolay Grishanov | Independent | 264 | 3.29% |
| Albert Shcherbachev | Independent | 246 | 3.07% |
| Boris Stolyarov | Independent | 228 | 2.84% |
| against all | | 1,475 | 18.39% |
| Total | | 8,022 | 100% |

=== 1999 ===
==== Declared candidates ====
- Ismagil Dominov (Independent), district hospital chief doctor
- Gennady Druzhinin (Independent), Member of Legislative Assembly of Krasnoyarsk Krai (1998–present), former Krasnoyarsk Aluminium Smelter board chairman (1996–1997)
- Viktor Gayulsky (NDR), incumbent Member of State Duma (1994–present), 1996 gubernatorial candidate
- Viktor Gitin (Yabloko), Member of State Duma (1996–present)
- Vladimir Ivanov (Independent), Member of Legislative Assembly of Krasnoyarsk Krai (1994–present), oil executive
- Ivan Kuznetsov (Independent), LDPR regional coordinator
- Viktor Orlov (OVR), former Minister of Natural Resources of Russia (1996–1998, 1998–1999)
- Lyudmila Plutulevichene (Independent), teacher
- Mikhail Sannikov (Independent), president of Alrosa (1999–present), former Member of State Assembly of the Sakha Republic (1993–1997), 1996 Yakutian presidential candidate
- Ilya Sergeyev (Independent), aircraft maintenance engineer
- Sergey Uoday (Independent), foundation director, 1995 candidate for this seat, 1997 gubernatorial candidate
- Vladimir Uvachan (ROS), former People's Deputy of Russia (1990–1993), former First Secretary of the CPSU Evenk Okrug Committee (1986–1991), 1993 and 1995 candidate for this seat

==== Withdrawn candidates ====
- Ivan Kirsanov (Independent)

==== Failed to qualify ====
- Yelena Berezkina (Independent)
- Yury Beti (Independent)
- Andrey Chevichalov (Independent), businessman
- Nikolay Grishanov (Independent), agriculture businessman, 1995 candidate for this seat
- Yelena Shulgina (SPR), nonprofit executive director

==== Results ====
Summary of the 19 December 1999 Russian legislative election in the Evenk constituency
| Candidate | Party | Votes | % |
|---|---|---|---|
| Gennady Druzhinin | Independent | 2,355 | 29.72% |
| Viktor Orlov | Fatherland – All Russia | 1,698 | 21.43% |
| Mikhail Sannikov | Independent | 1,561 | 19.70% |
| Sergey Uoday | Independent | 565 | 7.13% |
| Viktor Gayulsky (incumbent) | Our Home – Russia | 420 | 5.30% |
| Vladimir Ivanov | Independent | 415 | 5.24% |
| Vladimir Uvachan | Russian All-People's Union | 317 | 4.00% |
| Ismagil Dominov | Independent | 65 | 0.82% |
| Viktor Gitin | Yabloko | 32 | 0.40% |
| Ivan Kuznetsov | Independent | 30 | 0.38% |
| Lyudmila Plutulevichene | Independent | 24 | 0.30% |
| Ilya Sergeyev | Independent | 19 | 0.24% |
| against all | | 314 | 3.96% |
| Total | | 7,925 | 100% |

=== 2003 ===
==== Declared candidates ====
- Ruslan Delokarov (Independent), lawyer
- Oleg Stolyarov (United Russia), former Yukos executive

==== Failed to qualify ====
- Yevgeny Vasilyev (Independent), director of the Moscow State University of Economics, Statistics, and Informatics, Krasnoyarsk branch

==== Did not file ====
- Vladimir Fufurin (Independent), Yukos executive
- Nikolay Kitov (Independent), former Member of Legislative Assembly (Suglan) of the Evenk Autonomous Okrug (1997–2001)
- Aleksandr Matveyev (Independent), sport school instructor, 2003 Taymyr Autonomous Okrug gubernatorial candidate
- Nikolay Supryaga (Independent), former Head of Ilimpiyskiy District (2000–2001), 2001 gubernatorial candidate
- Sergey Uoday (Independent), foundation director, 1995 and 1999 candidate for this seat, 1997 gubernatorial candidate, 2003 Taymyr Autonomous Okrug gubernatorial candidate

==== Declined ====
- Gennady Druzhinin (Independent), incumbent Member of State Duma (2000–present)

==== Results ====
Summary of the 7 December 2003 Russian legislative election in the Evenk constituency
| Candidate | Party | Votes | % |
|---|---|---|---|
| Oleg Stolyarov | United Russia | 5,206 | 77.52% |
| Ruslan Delokarov | Independent | 155 | 2.31% |
| against all | | 1,266 | 18.85% |
| Total | | 6,717 | 100% |
