= Administrative divisions of Evenk Autonomous Okrug =

Administrative divisions of former Russian federal subject

Evenk Autonomous Okrug Russia

Administrative structure (as of December 31, 2006)
- Districts: 3
- Cities/towns: 0
- Urban-type settlements: 1
- Selsovets: 3

Municipal structure (as of 2002)
- Rural settlements: 26 (inhabited); 3 (uninhabited)

Evenk Autonomous Okrug was a federal subject of Russia until December 31, 2006. On January 1, 2007, it was merged into Krasnoyarsk Krai along with Taymyr Autonomous Okrug. During the transitional period it retains a special administrative status within Krasnoyarsk Krai.

== Administrative and municipal divisions ==
- Districts:
  - Evenkiysky (Эвенкийский)
    - Urban-type settlements under the district's jurisdiction:
      - Tura (Тура) (administrative center)
    - with 3 selsovets under the district's jurisdiction.
  - Baykitsky (Байкитский)
  - Ilimpiyskiy (Илимпийский)
  - Tungussko-Chunsky (Тунгусско-Чунский)

== See also ==
- Administrative divisions of Krasnoyarsk Krai
- Administrative divisions of Taymyr Autonomous Okrug
