= Ilimpiyskiy District =

Human settlement in Russia

Ilimpiyskiy District (Russian: Илимпийский район) was a former district (raion) of the former Evenk Autonomous Okrug which was merged into Krasnoyarsk Krai on 1 January 2007.

== Location ==
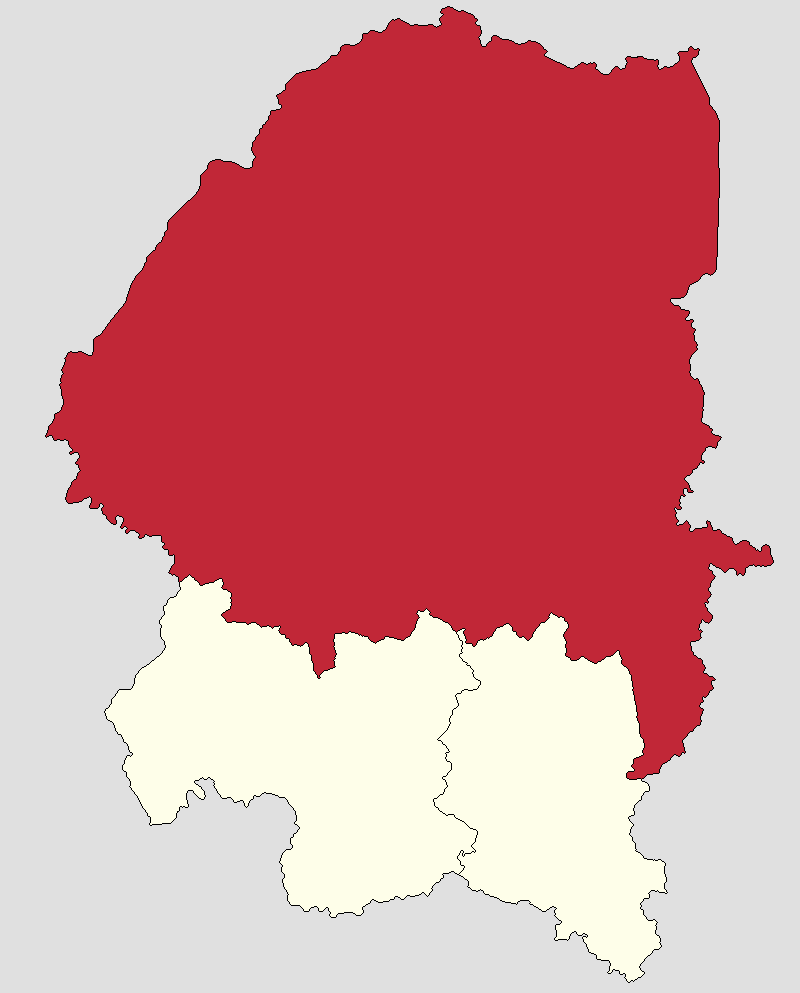
Former Ilimpiyskiy district on a map of Evenkia

Ilimpiyskiy district was located in the north of the Evenk Autonomous Okrug. The total area of the district was 497,600 km^{2}, roughly twice the size of Great Britain. Around one third of the district's territory lay to the north of the Arctic Circle. The administrative centre of the district, as well as of the former Evenk AO, was the town of Tura.

Ilimpiyskiy district shared borders with (clockwise from the north): Dudinsky and Khatangsky districts of Taymyr Autonomous Okrug, Olenyoksky and Mirninsky districts of the Republic of Sakha-Yakutia, Katangsky district of Irkutsk Oblast, Tungussko-Chunsky and Baykitsky districts within Evenk AO, and Turukhansky munincipal district of Krasnoyarsk Krai.

== Geography ==
Due to Ilimpiyskiy district's vast expanses with around a third of its territory to the north of the Arctic Circle, the winter months can cause temperatures in the former district (including in Tura) to fall dramatically and reach temperatures as low as -60 °C.

The district contained the geographical center of Russia, located at Lake Vivi. It is marked by a 7-metre-tall monument which was created in August 1992.

== History ==
Ilimpiyskiy district was founded, along with Baykitsky and Tungussko-Chunsky districts, on 3 August 1927, three years before Evenk AO was created. Upon the merger of Evenk AO and Krasnoyarsk Krai on 1 January 2007, Ilimpiyskiy district was abolished and now forms the northern area of Evenkiyskiy District.

== Demographics ==
=== Settlements ===
The district contained 10 settlements, 1 of which is abandoned (postal codes in brackets):

- The town of Tura (648000) - population 5,506
- The village of Yessey (648594) - population 625
- The village of Kislokan (648590) - population 104
- The village of Nidym (648571) - population 192
- The village of Tutonchany (648581) - population 223
- The village of Uchami (648580) - population 104
- The village of Chirinda (648593) - population 194
- The village of Ekonda (648592) - population 273
- The village of Yukta (648591) - population 89
- The village of Noginsk - abandoned since 16 February 2006

=== Population ===
The population of the town and 8 other inhabited settlements of the former district (since 1939) were:

- 1939: 2,646
- 1959: 5,248
- 1970: 7,272
- 1979: 8,697
- 1989: 11,124
- 2002: 8,173
- 2010: 7,487
