= Aleksandr Bokovikov =

Russian politician (1956–2010)

Governor of Evenk Autonomous Okrug
- In office 4 April 1997 – 22 April 2001
- Preceded by: Anatoly Yakimov
- Succeeded by: Boris Zolotaryov

Personal details
- Born: 7 September 1956 Ayan, Irkutsk Oblast, RSFSR, Soviet Union
- Died: 8 August 2010 (aged 53) Baykit, Evenkiysky District, Krasnoyarsk Krai, Russia

Aleksandr Aleksandrovich Bokovikov (Russian: Александр Александрович Боковиков, 7 September 1956 – 8 August 2010) was a Russian politician and businessman who served as the governor of the now defunct Evenk Autonomous Okrug from 1997 until 2001. The Evenk Autonomous Okrug was later merged into the Krasnoyarsk Krai on 1 January 2007 and incorporated into the Krasnoyarsk Krai as the Evenkiysky District.

== Biography ==
=== Political career ===
Bokovikov was elected as the first chairman of the Evenk Autonomous Okrug legislature, known as the Suglan, in 1994.

=== Governor of Evenk Autonomous Okrug ===
Bokovikov announced his candidacy for Governor of Evenk Autonomous Okrug in the 1996 gubernatorial election. He ran with the backing of both the People's Patriotic Union of Russia and the Communist Party of the Russian Federation. Bokovikov's main opponent was the incumbent head of the Evenk Autonomous Okrug, Anatoly Yakimov, who was supported by the All Russia Coordinating Council.

The gubernatorial election was held on 22 December 1996, but it would be March 1997 before a victor was announced due to irregularities in the election results. The initial election results showed Bokovikov defeating Yakimov by less than 100 votes. However, the final vote tally had Yakimov being re-elected by 550 votes over Bokovikov. Bokovikov filed a lawsuit against the Evenk Autonomous Okrug's election commission, with the goal of having the 1996 election results overturned. The results were not overturned, but a new gubernatorial election was held in March 1997 instead.

Aleksandr Bokovikov was elected Governor of Evenk Autonomous Okrug on 16 March 1997, nearly four months after the disputed December election.

Much of his focus as governor pertained to economic development in the okrug and raising the standard of living. He also opposed the sale of public land.

Bokovikov actively supported the Evenk Autonomous Okrug remaining a constituent part of the Krasnoyarsk Krai. Bokovikov signed a June 1997 treaty with then Krasnoyarsk Krai Governor Valery Zubov which explicitly stated that Evenk Autonomous Okrug was part of Krasnoyarsk Krai. The agreement also allowed residents of Evenk Autonomous Okrug to vote in Krasnoyarsk Krai's gubernatorial and legislative elections.

Bokovikov remained Governor of Evenk Autonomous Okrug until 2001. He was succeeded by Boris Zolotaryov, the last Governor of Evenk Autonomous Okrug before the okrug was abolished and incorporated into Krasnoyarsk Krai on 1 January 2007.

=== Later life ===
Bokovikov became the director of the Evenkiyanefteprodukt company after leaving office. He was elected to the Council of deputies in Tura, Evenkiysky District.

Aleksandr Bokovikov died on 8 August 2010, at the age of 53.
