= Vivi =

Vivi may refer to:

== People ==
- Albert Vivancos (born 1994), commonly known as Vivi, Spanish footballer
- ViVi (born 1996), stage name of Wong Ka Hei, Hong Kong born singer based in South Korea, member of Loona, Loona 1/3, and Loossemble
- Vivi (name), a given name and surname

== Places ==
- Vivi, Democratic Republic of the Congo, a town
- Lake Vivi in Evenkia, Russia
- Vivi (river), a tributary of the Nizhnyaya Tunguska in Evenkia, Russia
- Río Viví, a river in Puerto Rico

== Fictional characters ==
- Vivi, a main heroine from the manga Kamiyadori
- Nefertari Vivi, a character in the manga One Piece
- Vivi Ornitier, a main character in the 2000 role-playing game Final Fantasy IX
- Vivi, main character of Siren's second and final season

== Transport ==
- Vivi (rail transit), trade name of AS Pasažieru vilciens, the passenger railway operator of Latvia

== Other uses ==
- ViVi (magazine), a Japanese fashion magazine for young women
- ViVi (single album), by Loona
- ViVi, a virtual assistant developed by Vingroup special for VinFast

== See also ==
- Viiv (disambiguation)
- Vi (disambiguation)
