= Music of Evenkia =

Music associated with Evenkia in Russia

Music of Evenkia is the music associated with the Evenk Autonomous Okrug in Russia. One composer associated with the region was Oleg Chapogir, a native of Kislokan who wrote more than 200 songs and collaborated with other Evenk musicians.

== Oleg Chapogir ==
Oleg Chapogir (1952–2010) was a composer from Kislokan in Evenkia. He studied at Norilsk Musical College in Norilsk and wrote more than 200 songs. He released eight albums in collaboration with Nikolai Oyogir and Alitet Nemtushkin, and published the collection Songs of the Taiga Region.
