= Preobrazhenka, Irkutsk Oblast =

Preobrazhenka Преображенка
- Village
- Location within Irkutsk Oblast Location within Russia
- Coordinates: 60°1′25″N 108°5′34″E
- Country: Russia
- Republic: Irkutsk
- District: Katangsky
- Rural settlement district: Preobrazhenskoye

Area
  - Total: 1.03 km^{2} (0.40 sq mi)
- Elevation: 298 m (978 ft)

Population (2025)
  - Total: 348
  - Density: 338/km^{2} (875/sq mi)
- Time zone: UTC+8 (IRKT)
- Postal code: 666625
- Area code: 39560

Preobrazhenka, also known as Preobrazhenskoye (Russian: Преображенка) is a village in Katangsky District, Irkutsk Oblast, Russia, that lies along the Nizhnyaya Tunguska river. The village has seventeen streets, its own airfield, and is connected to the outside world by helicopter flights, twice a month in the winter and thrice a month in the summer, to nearby towns/villages Kirensk, Nepa, Erema, and Yerbogachen in a circular flight route.

== Geography and climate ==
=== Demographics ===
As of 2025, the population is estimated to be around 348 (numerical average of two conflicting sources):

- The village is inhabited by approximately 34 people under 7 years old, 40 people from 8 to 18 years old, 41 people from 19 to 30 years old, 146 people from 31 to 60 years old, 74 people from 60 to 80 years old, and 5 people over 80 years old.
- The gender distribution is approximately 154 men and 201 women.
- Approximately 200 residents have attended higher education, 60 have attended up to high school education equivalent, and the remaining 95 have not attended high school education equivalent.
- The village has a 5.8% approximate unemployment rate. Approximately 59.6% are employed and 29% on pensions.
- There are approximately 28 people in the village with disabilities.

Year	Population
2002	561
2010	440 (218 men, 222 women)
2011	438
2012	430
2019	314
2020	323
2021	381
2022	320
2024	244 (33 children, living in 113 residential buildings)
2025	348

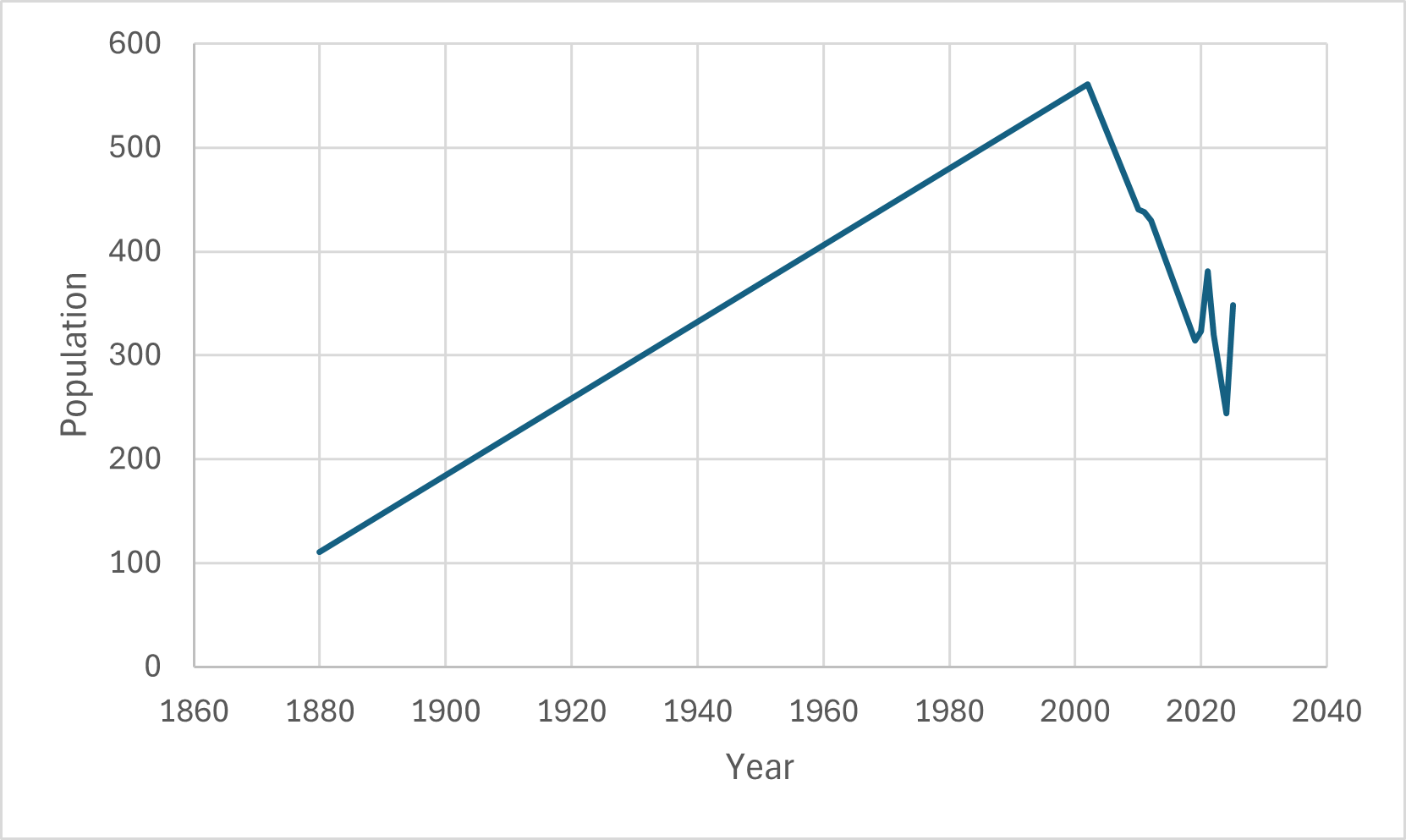
Historical population graph of Preobrazhenka

=== Geology ===
The Preobrazhenka layer that the village sits on top of represents a significant geological formation within the Danilovo horizon of the Vendian system in the southeastern Siberian Platform. Dating to the Late Vendian period (approximately 540-535 million years ago), it consists primarily of dolomitic rocks that overlie the Tira horizon, often following a substantial pre-Danilovo break in sedimentation that lasted 10-20 million years. The Preobrazhenka layer (sometimes referred to as "layer 2" in stratigraphic studies) is particularly notable as an oil and gas-bearing stratum in the pre-Lena-Nepa and Erbogachen zones of the Nepa-Botuoba oil and gas region. Within the regional stratigraphic sequence, it appears after the Il'bokich layer and represents the beginning of the Danilovo horizon in sections where earlier layers are absent, particularly in the southern part of the Nepa-Botuoba and most sections of the Angara-Lena oil and gas regions.

=== Climate ===
Preobrazhenka has a severe continental climate with extremely cold winters and mild summers. Based on temperature data from 1951 to 2024, the village experiences a wide annual temperature range of approximately 50 °C. January and February are the coldest months with average temperatures typically between -25 °C and -30 °C, while occasional cold spells can bring temperatures below -35 °C. July is the warmest month with average temperatures ranging from 15 °C to 19 °C. The village sees a short warm season from June to August when average temperatures remain above 10 °C, while the long winter period (November through March) maintains temperatures well below freezing. Spring and autumn are brief transitional seasons, with April marking the transition to positive temperatures and October returning to below-freezing conditions. The annual mean temperature for Preobrazhenka is approximately -5 °C, indicating its location in a cold climate zone typical of continental Siberia.

== History ==
In a genetic report, ancient DNA discovered in Preobrazhenka hint that the area has been populated since at least 991BC, but the first official documentation of the village dates back to the 17th century when it was founded by settlers as a small settlement, before gradually developing and growing. In the 19th century, Preobrazhenka became an important center for trade and exchange of goods between local residents and merchants from other regions of Russia. Fairs and bazaars were held there selling food, household items, and other goods.

In 1880, a census was carried out confirming Preobrazhenka had 17 households, consisting of 57 males and 53 females. The most common surnames of the settlers were "Zyrianov" and "Iuriev" at the time.

Preobrazhenka was the seat of now-defunct Preobrazhensky District from 1926 to 1929, but in 1930, Preobrazhensky District was incorporated into newly formed Evenki National Raion of Katanga. During World War II, a significant number of male residents living in Preobrazhenka were conscripted to fight Nazi Germany forces. After World War II, development continued in the village, including construction of hospitals, schools, houses and other infrastructure (e.g. a post office). In the 1960s, industrial development began, which led to an increase in population size for the village and a reported increase in quality of life. As of 2024, Preobrazhenka residents still report low pollution levels and occasional tourists.

In 2013, an Angara Airlines Mil Mi-8 helicopter carrying nine emergency rescue crew working for the regional government, as well as two tonnes of explosives, took off from the village and crashed six kilometers from Preobrazhenka - originally bound for a location along the Nizhnyaya Tunguska river to break up ice blocking it, before it stopped responding. At the time, the Preobrazhenka village had been in a state of emergency as water level rose almost nine metres (30 feet) after the ice blocked the water flow and 125 homes were flooded. The wreckage was discovered around 4 1/2 hours after the aircraft disappeared from the radar. All nine people on board died.

In 2015, a radiocarbon dating study was carried out by Irkutsk State University in a cemetery in Preobrazhenka analyzing the marine reservoir effect that originated from the cemetery's presence alongside the Nizhnyaya Tunguska river.

The village is subject to very frequent flooding:

- In 2015, a flood from the Nizhnyaya Tunguska River submerged 200 houses underwater. 250 residents were placed in temporary tent camps away from the flood zone, fed 540 loaves of bread delivered on two flights and given well water to drink. The flood situation was resolved in two days (electricity and heating supply restored, school re-opened) by 87 rescue workers, needing a rescue helicopter.
- In 2019, the village experienced significant flooding when an ice jam on the river caused a sharp rise in water levels. The flooding affected 15 houses (home to 34 residents) and 38 garden plots. The Russian Ministry of Emergency Situations (EMERCOM) deployed rescuers via helicopter to assist residents by moving equipment, furniture, and firewood to higher locations, while some affected residents were temporarily accommodated with relatives. Authorities conducted blasting operations to destroy the ice jam, with Deputy Head Valery Shantz of the EMERCOM's Irkutsk Region office noting that water levels were expected to stabilize due to decreasing levels upstream at Podvoloshino and Nepa. A state of emergency was declared for the Katanga region, with emergency supplies of food, water, and essential items stocked in the settlement, and satellite phone communication established with residents.
- In 2023, another flood from the river occurred in Preobrazhenka, where one woman died, seven people were injured and sent to the nearest medical facility by an EMERCOM helicopter, and 109 households were destroyed.
- In 2024, another flood occurred. 16 adults and 13 children were evacuated from the village by the day following the flood - seven of these people (three children) were temporarily housed in accommodation centers in Yerbogachen, and the rest were sent to stay with their relatives. Rescuers noted that the day before, on May 2, blasting operations were carried out on Nizhnyaya Tunguska to weaken the ice fields. The Ministry of Emergency Situations did not explain why they did not produce a positive result.
- Another flood almost occurred in 2025 because of another ice jam but was prevented by EMERCOM workers before any significant rise in sea level could happen. The EMERCOM workers pre-evacuated 37 people from the village a week before the flood anyway. The area where the ice jams occur has now been reinforced by twelve hydrological stations to retroactively detect and prevent any further potential floods.

The Woodrow Wilson International Center for Scholars labelled Preobrazhenka a 'historic site' for monuments present there (elaborated on in the next section).

== Tourism and culture ==
Tourist attractions in Preobrazhenka include:

- Mount Belaya Taiga, a natural feature located within the forests surrounding Preobrazhenka. It is a common destination for hiking, offering views of the surrounding landscape, including forests, rivers, and lakes. On clear days, distant settlements are visible from the summit. The mountain is noted for its scenic and ecological significance.
- The Golden Shore Estate, a historical site associated with Siberian merchants. The estate features preserved architecture and provides insights into local history and traditions.
- Sacred Lake, also called "Siberian Mirror," a freshwater lake known for its clear waters and reflective surface. It is surrounded by forested areas with cedar and pine trees. The lake's ecosystem and visual appeal make it a notable feature of the region.
- The History Museum of Preobrazhenka contains exhibits related to the area's history, including artifacts from early inhabitants and displays on local customs and events. It serves as a resource for understanding the cultural and historical development of the region.

== Education ==
A preschool (kindergarten) established in 2001, headed by Abliksanova Irina Valerievna since 2020, and a secondary school established in 2000, headed by Lishchinskaya Elena Olegovna since 2008, are present as of 2025, both of which are debt-funded, managed and regularly inspected by the Irkutsk regional government.

The preschool has undergone two arbitration cases and fifteen lawsuits (mostly labor disputes) since its establishment, having to pay out a total of 41,000 rubles ($500) in settlements to plaintiffs.

The secondary school has been undergone six arbitration cases and five lawsuits since its establishment, having to pay out a total of 2.3 million rubles ($28,000) in settlements to plaintiffs.

== Notable people ==
- Zharnikov Vasily Pavlovich (1911–1966) - Soviet military leader, major general of aviation.
