= Nakson =

- гора Наксон
- Location within Krasnoyarsk Krai

Highest point
- Elevation: 1,035 m (3,396 ft)
- Coordinates: 65°46′0″N 95°37′0″E

Geography
- Location: Evenky District, Krasnoyarsk Krai, Russia
- Parent range: Syverma

Nakson (Russian: гора Наксон) is a mountain in Krasnoyarsk Krai, Russia. At 1,035 m (3,396 ft) is the highest mountain in the Syverma Plateau, part of the Central Siberian Plateau.

== See also ==
- List of mountains in Russia
