= Ust'-Kamo =

Ust'-Kamo Усть-Камо
- Location in Russia Ust'-Kamo (Russia)
- Coordinates: 60°43′1″N 97°31′1″E
- Country: Russia
- Federal subject: Krasnoyarsk
- District: Baykitsky
- Elevation: 307 m (1,007 ft)

Population (2016)
  - Total: 0
- Time zone: UTC+7 (KRAT)
- Postal code: 648378
- Area code: 39170

Ust'-Kamo (Russian: Усть-Камо) is a remote, abandoned village in Krasnoyarsk Krai, Russia situated next to the Podkamennaya Tunguska river with a continental climate. The village was abolished from the administrative jurisdiction of the former Evenk Autonomous Okrug in 2002, from 2002 to 2010, the village was abandoned due to the extreme weather, then repopulated between 2010 and 2016, then abandoned again in 2016 and it became abolished as a census location due to its lack of population, it mainly consisted of Evenk and Russian demographics identifying of Animist and Orthodox beliefs. The village was municipally part of a rural settlement named Kuyumba, after merging as a village, until 2011.

The abandoned village still has a functioning meteorological station where observations started on January 6, 1933, 178 meters above sea level.
