= Kuiumba =

Kuiumba Куюмба
- Village
- Location within Krasnoyarsk Krai Location within Russia
- Coordinates: 60°57′29″N 96°58′37″E
- Country: Russia
- Krai: Krasnoyarsk
- District: Evenkiysky
- Rural settlement district: Kuyumba

Area
  - Total: 0.416 km^{2} (0.161 sq mi)
- Elevation: 191 m (627 ft)

Population (2021)
  - Total: 141
  - Density: 339/km^{2} (878/sq mi)
- Time zone: UTC+7 (KRAT)
- Postal code: 648373

Kuiumba, also known as Kuyumba (Russian: Куюмба) is an Evenki ethnic village in Evenkiysky District, Krasnoyarsk Krai, Russia notable for its pivotal role in the discovery and development of Evenk oil. As of 2025, the village contains an elementary school-kindergarten, a paramedic-midwifery station, a community center, a helipad, a Russian Post post office, and two district-level government offices.

== History ==
Kuiumba was founded as a village by the Soviet Union in 1924, but documentation of Kuiumba dates back to 1941, when Kuiumba was recognized to have its own district within the north of Krasnoyarsk Krai, and surrounding districts were known to have low literacy levels.

In 2002, Kuiumba was given its own rural settlement district, which also included abandoned village Ust'-Kamo until 2017.

There has been a history of pollution and environmental waste in Kuiumba and surrounding indigenous regions (possibly attributed to local oil extraction by the companies Slavneft-Krasnoyarskneftegaz and Rosneft) as well as a large number of abandoned tanks, log houses and forestry infrastructure, which reflect the region's neglect and lack of investment by the Russian government. Oil companies that own oil fields in and around the village have to adopt responsibilities that would otherwise be taken care of by government - making Kuiumba somewhat akin to a company town. In an attempt to counter this, the government built the aforementioned community center in the late 2010s to fulfil what it called 'cultural and ethnic quality of life indicators for indigenous peoples'.

=== Fire incident ===
In 2019, Kuiumba faced a threat from a taiga wildfire that approached within 5 kilometers of the village. Emergency crews conducted controlled burns and cleared vegetation to prevent the fire from spreading. The regional Ministry of Emergency Situations reported no smoke or panic among the 202 residents, and paramedics were dispatched from Baikit to monitor health risks. The fire was attributed to prolonged dry conditions, with temperatures reaching 30 °C and dry thunderstorms in the region. At the time, wildfires in northern Krasnoyarsk Krai covered 907,000 hectares, though most were in monitored zones where intervention occurred only near populated areas.

=== 100-year anniversary event ===
In 2024, the village celebrated its 100-year anniversary with a large-scale event attended by residents and guests from neighboring settlements. The festivities included a concert featuring performances by accordionist Roman Chaika, Sevastyan Martynyuk (a soloist from the Krasnoyarsk Opera and Ballet Theatre), and local creative groups from the Evenkiysky District. The program included traditional Evenki songs such as "Evenkia", "I Love You, Russia", and "I Dream of the Village", alongside various Soviet film classics. As part of the centenary celebrations, the local oil industry (Rosneft and Slavneft-Krasnoyarskneftegaz) donated a children’s playground and organized educational activities for youth, including oil-themed games and art workshops.

== Population ==
Year	Population	Additional information
2010	179	2010 Russian census. Population consisted of 100 Evenkis, 44 Russians and 35 people of other ethnicities.
2019	202	202 populated within 51 households.
2020	140	None
2021	141	None

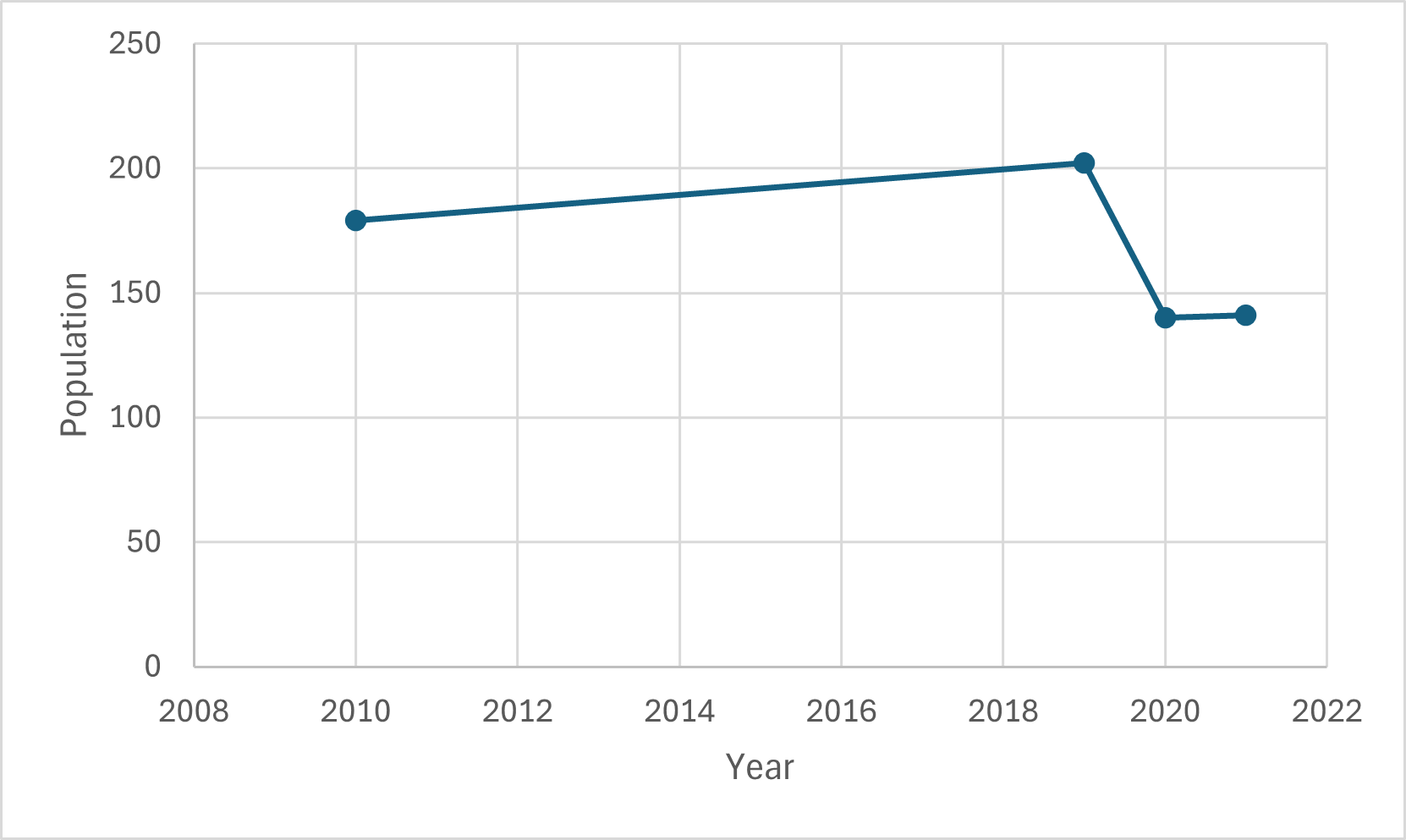
Kuiumba population graph.

== Economy ==
The village's economy is closely tied to the Kuyumbinskoye oil field, discovered on November 15, 1973, when the ‘Kuyumbinskaya-1’ well struck oil at a depth of over 2,000 meters. The discovery was accidental, resulting from logistical delays during equipment transport that forced geologists to drill at an unplanned site. Initially met with skepticism, the find confirmed the field’s potential, though its remote location and lack of infrastructure delayed large-scale development.

In the 1970s–80s, airstrips were built in nearby settlements like Tura and Baikit to support exploration. The field, now operated by Slavneft-Krasnoyarskneftegaz, gained strategic importance after being connected to the Kuyumba–Tayshet pipeline in 2017, linking it to the Eastern Siberia–Pacific Ocean oil pipeline system. Production surged from 238,700 tons in 2017 to 956,000 tons by 2019, with peak output projected at 10.8 million tons annually.

Another significant oil field developed by Rosneft, the Yurubcheno-Tokhomskoye field, further anchors the local economy. Most of Kuiumba's working population is employed by these two companies.

Kuiumba maintains close ties with the oil industry, particularly through Slavneft-Krasnoyarskneftegaz. The company supports local initiatives, including annual events like Oil Worker's Day celebrations. In 2021, the 20th anniversary of Slavneft-Krasnoyarskneftegaz was marked with a community festival in Kuiumba, featuring concerts, children's activities, and educational programs about the oil industry. The company also provides school supplies for students and sponsors infrastructure for the village's school and kindergarten.
