= Tembenchi =

Location
- Country: Russia

Physical characteristics
- Source: Putorana Plateau
  - coordinates: 67°36′9″N 94°22′48″E
- Mouth: Kochechum
  - coordinates: 64°36′32″N 99°55′46″E
- Length: 571 km (355 mi)
- Basin size: 21,600 km^{2} (8,300 sq mi)

Basin features
- Progression: Kochechum→ Nizhnyaya Tunguska→ Yenisey→ Kara Sea

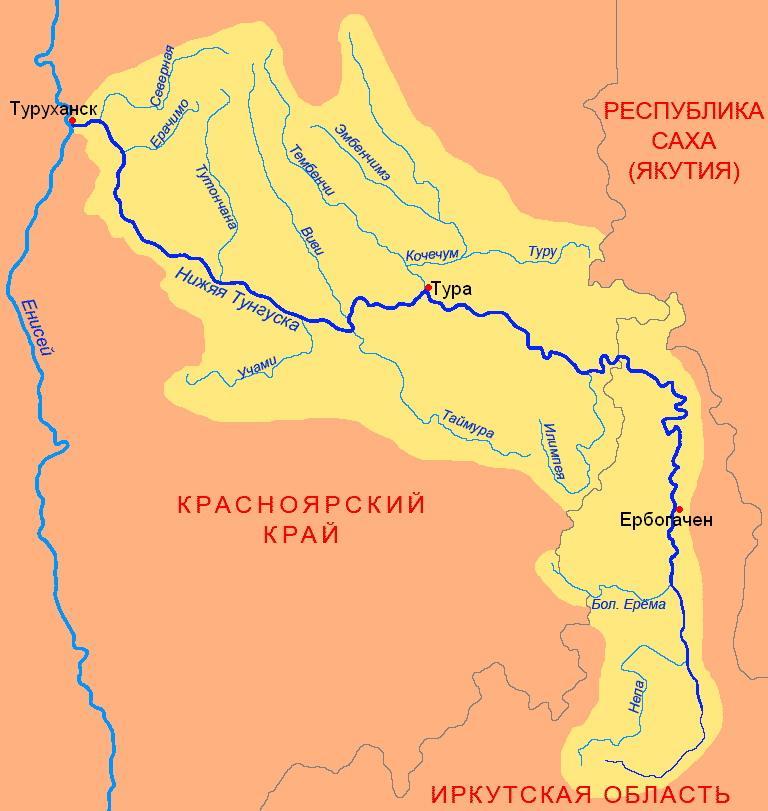
Map. The river flows from the northeast to the southeast in the northern central part of the oblast and joins the Kochechum near Tura (Тура́).

The Tembenchi (Russian: Тембенчи) is a major river of Krasnoyarsk Krai in Siberia, central Russia, joining the Kochechum to the northwest of Tura. The river, which has its source in the Putorana Plateau, is 571 kilometres (355 mi) long, and its basin covers 21,600 square kilometres (8,300 mi^{2}).

The river runs through the remote, sparsely inhabited Syverma Plateau with a very severe climate; there is no vegetation, except mosses, lichens and herbs. Like all Siberian rivers, it suffers from long periods of frost for six to seven months a year, from late October to May, and large tracts of land remain permanently frozen at depth. The river is fed mainly by snowmelt and its high water lasts from late May through until September. Its lower course is characterised by basalts, draining a narrow and rather deep valley of the northwest of the Central Siberian plateau known as Syverma Plateau. The river in its upper course flows through two lakes, one of which is Lake Tembenchi, which is nearly 50 kilometres (31 mi) long. Then the river passes the towns of Burungda and Tembenchi on the way to Tura, where it joins the Kochechum.
