= Viv =

VIV or Viv may refer to:

== People ==
- Viv (given name), a list of people and fictional characters
- Viv., the standard author abbreviation of Domenico Viviani (1772–1840), Italian botanist and naturalist

== Places ==
- 2558 Viv, the asteroid Viv, a main belt asteroid, the 2558th asteroid registered
- Vivigani Airfield (IATA airport code VIV), Papua New Guinea
- The Vivian (nicknamed "The Vivs"), Sketty, Swansea, Wales, UK; a pub

== Groups, organizations, companies ==
- Vivo Participacoes (NYSE stock symbol VIV), Brazilian cell phone operator
- Vivendi (Euronext stock symbol VIV), French holding company
- The Vivs, a band founded by Terri Brosius

== Other uses ==
- Vortex induced vibration
- Viv (software), personal assistance software
- .viv, the filename extension of Vivo video files
- The VIV's (AUDELCO presents the Vivian Robinson Recognition Awards) for African American art

== See also ==
- V/V (five of five)
- v/v (volume by volume)
- Viiv (disambiguation)
