= Essey =

Essey may refer to:

- Essey, Côte-d'Or, a commune in Côte-d'Or, France
- Essey-et-Maizerais, a commune in Meurthe-et-Moselle, France
- Essey-la-Côte, a commune in Meurthe-et-Moselle, France
- Essey-lès-Nancy, a commune in Meurthe-et-Moselle, France
- Yessey, a rural settlement in Krasnoyarsk Krai

== See also ==
- Essay, piece of writing
