= Viiv (disambiguation) =

ViiV Healthcare is a UK pharmaceutical company

Viiv may also refer to:

- Intel Viiv computing platform
- 1989 Tiananmen Square protests and massacre (June 4), expressed as VIIV (6–4 in Roman numerals) as an alternate name

== See also ==
- VIV (disambiguation)
- Vivi (disambiguation)
