= Kochechum =

Coordinates: 64°17′00″N 100°13′00″E

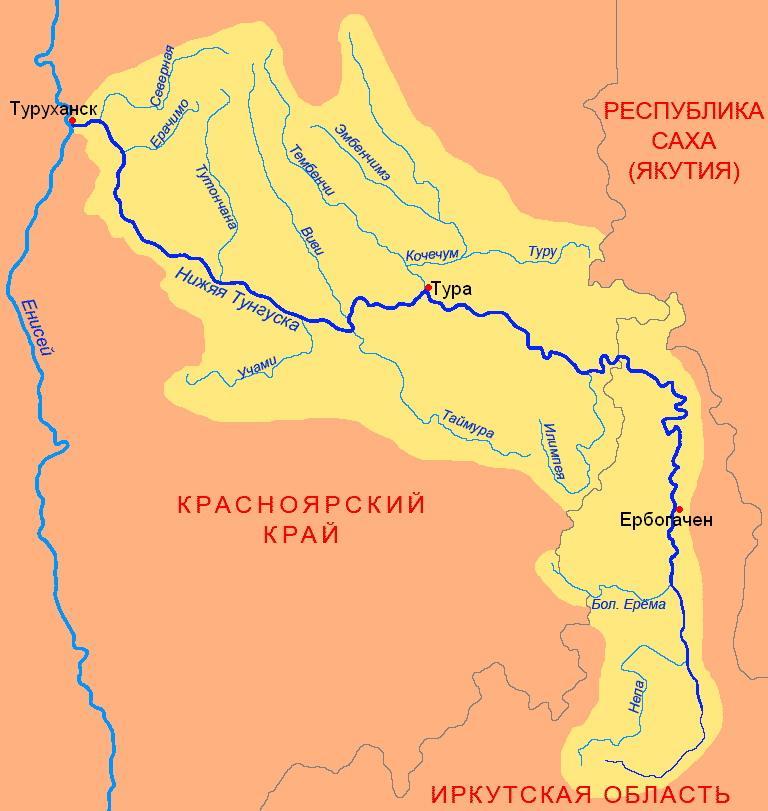
- Map in Russian of the Nizhnyaya Tunguska basin with Kochechum river joining it from the north near locality Tura.
- Native name: Кочечум (Russian)

Location
- Country: Russia
- Federal subject: Krasnoyarsk Krai
- City: Tura

Physical characteristics
- Source
  - location: Central Siberian Plateau
- Mouth: Nizhnyaya Tunguska
  - elevation: 125 m (410 ft)
- Length: 733 km (455 mi)
- Basin size: 96,400 km^{2} (37,200 sq mi)
- Discharge
  - location: mouth
  - average: 600 m^{3}/s (21,000 cu ft/s)

Basin features
- Progression: Nizhnyaya Tunguska→ Yenisey→ Kara Sea

The Kochechum (Russian: Кочечум) is a river in Siberia, Russia. It flows through the Syverma Plateau in Krasnoyarsk Krai. It is a right and most significant tributary of the Nizhnyaya Tunguska.

== General information ==
The river is 733 kilometres (455 mi) long, and its watershed covers 96,400 square kilometres (37,200 mi^{2}). The average discharge at the mouth is 600 cubic metres per second (21,000 cu ft/s). The part of its basin near the source lies on the southern slopes of Putorana Plateau. It flows to the south direction through Syverma Plateau and joins Nizhnyaya Tunguska near the town Tura. The primary tributaries of the Kochechum are Embenchime, Tembenchi and Turu.

The confluence of Kochechum and Nizhnyaya Tunguska corresponds to the farthest point of fairway section upstream off the Yenisey.

== Climatic conditions and water regime ==
The basin of the river entirely belongs to the zone of continental subarctic climate. Winter period starts in October and ends in May, during calendar winter temperatures can plummet below −60 °C (−76 °F). Due to average temperatures below freezing in this area, its watershed belongs to the region of continuous permafrost with a frozen layer that varies in depth between 50 and 200 metres (160 and 660 ft). The permafrost effectively blocks any underground supply; all water flowing through the river comes from snow and rain. The river stays ice-bound from October to May or June every year.

As watershed area does not contain any significant lakes. The flow of the Kochechum strongly depends on the season, approaching zero in early spring and reaching its maximum in June. The latter month corresponds to a seasonal inundation, which usually produces 75 percent of the overall annual yield of water.
