= Vivi (river) =

River in Krasnoyarsk Krai, Russia

Vivi Виви
- Mouth location in Krasnoyarsk Krai, Russia

Location
- Country: Evenky District, Krasnoyarsk Krai, Russia

Physical characteristics
- Source
  - location: Lake Vivi
  - coordinates: 66°23′46″N 94°12′46″E
  - elevation: 255 m (837 ft)
- Mouth: Nizhnyaya Tunguska
  - coordinates: 63°52′18″N 97°49′46″E
  - elevation: 100 m (330 ft)
- Length: 426 km (265 mi)
- Basin size: 26,800 km^{2} (10,300 sq mi)

Basin features
- Progression: Nizhnyaya Tunguska→ Yenisey→ Kara Sea

The Vivi (Russian: Виви) is a river in Krasnoyarsk Krai, Russia. It is a right hand tributary of the Nizhnyaya Tunguska.

The Vivi is 426 kilometres (265 mi) long, and the area of its basin is 26,800 square kilometres (10,300 mi^{2}).

A damaged An-2 aircraft was discovered in the area of the river Vivi on 28 July 2011.

== Course ==
The Vivi has its source where the southern limit of the Putorana Plateau overlaps with the Syverma Plateau. It begins at the southern end of Lake Vivi and is fast-flowing with many rapids. The Vivi flows roughly southeastwards across the Syverma Plateau in a very remote area where there are very rarely any people. The Vivi joins the right bank of the Nizhnyaya Tunguska near where the latter flows west into the eastern side of the Tunguska Plateau.

There are more than 500 small lakes in the river's basin with a total area of about 268 square kilometres (103 sq mi). The Logancha meteorite crater is also located in the Vivi basin.

== See also ==
- List of rivers of Russia
