= Mutoray =

Mutoray Муторай
- Interactive map of Mutoray
- Location of Mutoray
- Coordinates: 61°19′35″N 100°28′57″E
- Country: Russia
- Federal subject: Krasnoyarsk Krai
- Founded: 1926

Government
  - Head: Roman Leonidovich Basnin

Area
  - Total: 0.34 km^{2} (0.13 sq mi)
- Elevation: 332 m (1,089 ft)

Population
  - Estimate (55 (2025)): 77 )

Municipal status
  - Municipal district: Evenkiysky Municipal District
- Time zone: UTC+7 (MSK+4)
- Postal code: 648483
- OKTMO ID: 04650462101

Mutoray (Russian: Муторай) is a rural settlement (a posyolok) in the Evenkiysky District of Krasnoyarsk Krai, Russia. It forms the rural settlement of the "posyolok of Mutoray" as the sole inhabited locality within its jurisdiction. Prior to 2002, according to the Law on the Administrative-Territorial Structure of the Evenk Autonomous Okrug, it was classified as a village (selo).

== Geography ==
It is located on the right bank of the Chunya River.

== History ==
The settlement or Selo was founded in 1926 as a trading post (faktoriya) for the Syrtyo joint-stock company.

== Population ==
The population of Mutoray has changed over the years:

- 2020: 100 residents
- 2021: 76 residents
- 2025: 55 residents
