= Salvelinus tolmachoffi =

Conservation status
- Endangered (IUCN 3.1)

Scientific classification
- Kingdom: Animalia
- Phylum: Chordata
- Class: Actinopterygii
- Division: Teleostei
- Order: Salmoniformes
- Family: Salmonidae
- Genus: Salvelinus
- Species: S. tolmachoffi

Binomial name
- Salvelinus tolmachoffi L.S. Berg, 192

Species of fish

Salvelinus tolmachoffi, also known as Yessey lake charr, is a freshwater species of fish in the salmon family. It is endemic to Lake Yessey of the Khatanga river basin of the arctic Russia. In 2007, the fish was listed as endangered by IUCN due to over-fishing and poor management of the water body.

== Description ==
Yessey lake charr can grow to a recorded maximum length of 37.0 cm (14.6 inches). The fish lives at or near the bottom of the lake.

The head and back of the fish are blue-black, while the sides of the body are dark-gray with a golden tint and the belly is pale yellow. There are numerous red spots on the sides of the body. The species feed on gammarus, copepods, chironomid larvae, and fish.

Yessey lake charr spawn in autumn, from the second half of October to December, in coastal areas with depths of 2.5 - 4 m.
