= Boris Zolotaryov =

Russian politician (born 1953)

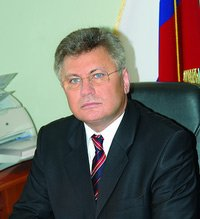

3rd Governor of Evenk Autonomous Okrug
- In office 22 April 2001 – 31 December 2006
- Preceded by: Aleksandr Bokovikov
- Succeeded by: Office abolished

Personal details
- Born: 13 March 1953 (age 73) Temirgoyevskaya, Krasnodar Krai, Russian SFSR, Soviet Union
- Education: Moscow Institute of Electronic Technology

Boris Nikolayevich Zolotaryov (Russian: Борис Николаевич Золотарёв; born 13 March 1953) was the head of administration of Evenk Autonomous Okrug (22 April 2001 – 31 December 2006).

He is a graduate of Evening Faculty of Moscow Institute of Electronic Technology in 1984. In 1987, Zolotaryov became deputy director of the Kvant electronic plant in Zelenograd near Moscow. From 1989 to 1998, Zolotaryov worked at Bank Menatep and then from 1998 to 2001 at the Yukos oil company where he was responsible for oil supply across Russia. In 2001 he won the gubernatorial election in Evenk Autonomous Okrug. Zolotaryov oversaw Evenkia's unification with Krasnoyarsk Krai which was finalized on 1 January 2007.
