= Yessey =

Yessey Ессей
- Settlement
- Interactive map of Yessey
- Location of Yessey Yessey (Krasnoyarsk Krai)
- Coordinates: 68°27′54.76″N 102°11′19.45″E
- Country: Russia
- Federal subject: Krasnoyarsk Krai
- Administrative district: Evenkiysky District
- Ostrog: 1628
- Elevation: 242 m (794 ft)

Population
  - Estimate (2025): 754 )
- Time zone: UTC+7 (MSK+4)
- Postal code: 648594
- OKTMO ID: 04650432101

Yessey (Russian: Ессе́й, Yakut: Дьэһиэй, romanized: Cehiey) is a rural locality (a settlement) in Evenkiysky District of Krasnoyarsk Krai, Russia, located on the shore of Lake Yessey.

== History ==
The historian of Siberia, B.O. Dolgikh, writes that in 1628 Ostrog was built by the Mangazey Cossacks - collectors of yasak (royal tribute).

In 1852, local residents (Yakuts and Evenks) were the first among the indigenous population to accept the Orthodox faith. In 1892, the first Orthodox church in Evenkia was built with the donations of merchants. In 1984, Under Soviet rule, the church was demolished. In 2018, the head of the Evenki region, Yevgeny Vasilyev, decided to build the church of St. Basil the Great in Yessey.

== Climate ==
Yessey has a subarctic climate (Köppen climate classification Dfc) with extremely cold winters and mild summers. Precipitation is quite low but is somewhat higher in summer than at other times of the year. The unofficial record low temperature is −73 °C (−99 °F)

Climate data for Yessey
Month	Jan	Feb	Mar	Apr	May	Jun	Jul	Aug	Sep	Oct	Nov	Dec	Year
Record high °C (°F)	−1.0 (30.2)	−2.2 (28.0)	6.0 (42.8)	10.0 (50.0)	20.4 (68.7)	30.4 (86.7)	33.0 (91.4)	29.0 (84.2)	24.0 (75.2)	12.8 (55.0)	2.8 (37.0)	−1.1 (30.0)	33.0 (91.4)
Mean daily maximum °C (°F)	−31.1 (−24.0)	−28.8 (−19.8)	−18.4 (−1.1)	−8.1 (17.4)	1.0 (33.8)	11.5 (52.7)	18.1 (64.6)	14.7 (58.5)	6.4 (43.5)	−9.0 (15.8)	−23.4 (−10.1)	−27.1 (−16.8)	−7.9 (17.9)
Daily mean °C (°F)	−35.5 (−31.9)	−33.1 (−27.6)	−24.2 (−11.6)	−13.9 (7.0)	−3.3 (26.1)	7.0 (44.6)	13.6 (56.5)	10.5 (50.9)	2.9 (37.2)	−13.0 (8.6)	−27.8 (−18.0)	−32.0 (−25.6)	−12.4 (9.7)
Mean daily minimum °C (°F)	−40.5 (−40.9)	−38.4 (−37.1)	−31.2 (−24.2)	−21.6 (−6.9)	−9.1 (15.6)	2.5 (36.5)	8.4 (47.1)	5.7 (42.3)	−0.9 (30.4)	−17.6 (0.3)	−32.7 (−26.9)	−37.4 (−35.3)	−17.7 (0.1)
Record low °C (°F)	−60.0 (−76.0)	−59.0 (−74.2)	−51.0 (−59.8)	−43.9 (−47.0)	−31.1 (−24.0)	−11.1 (12.0)	−4.4 (24.1)	−6.0 (21.2)	−20.0 (−4.0)	−39.2 (−38.6)	−53.7 (−64.7)	−59.0 (−74.2)	−60.0 (−76.0)
Average precipitation mm (inches)	6.9 (0.27)	5.3 (0.21)	8.4 (0.33)	13.4 (0.53)	16.4 (0.65)	32.4 (1.28)	39.1 (1.54)	51.7 (2.04)	26.7 (1.05)	18.2 (0.72)	11.3 (0.44)	9.6 (0.38)	239.4 (9.44)
Mean monthly sunshine hours	3.1	42.0	164.3	240.0	272.8	276.0	303.8	189.1	87.0	65.1	6.0	0.0	1,649.2
Source: climatebase.ru (1957-1993)
