= Lake Yessey =

Freshwater arctic lake in Russia

Lake Yessey Ессей
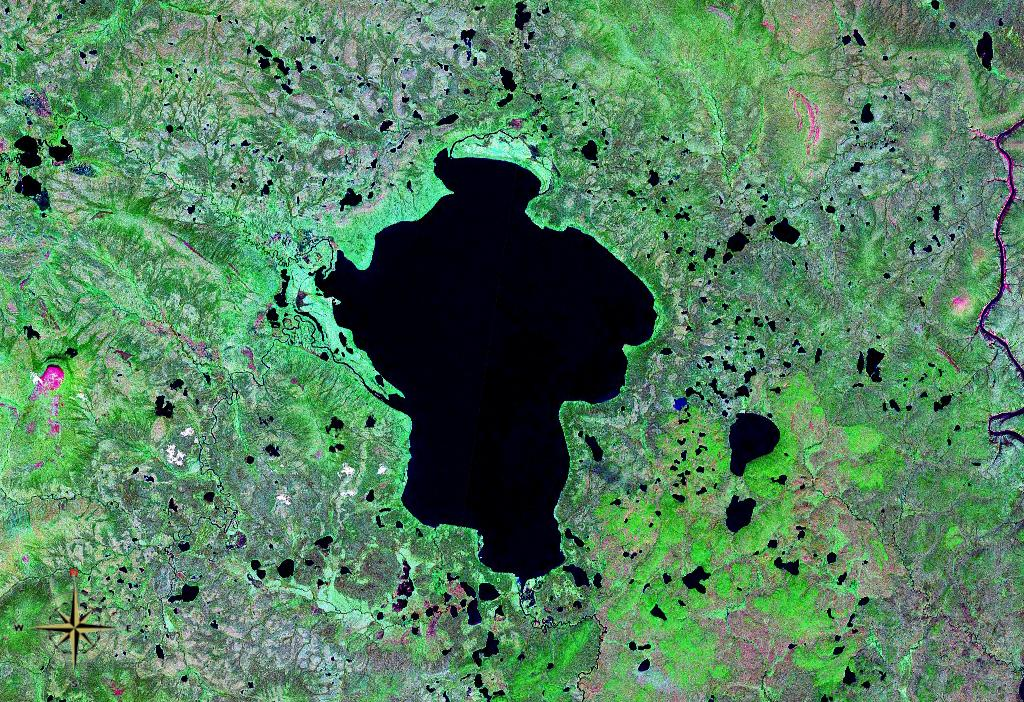
- seen from space (false color)

- Location within Russia Location within Krasnoyarsk Krai
- Location: Yessey, Krasnoyarsk Krai, north-central Russia
- Coordinates: 68.4666667°N 102.4166667°E
- Primary outflows: Unnamed left tributary of the Kotuy
- Basin countries: Russia
- Surface area: 238 km^{2} (92 sq mi)
- Max. depth: 13 m (43 ft)

Lake Yessey (Russian: Ессе́й) is a large freshwater arctic lake in Evenkiysky District, Krasnoyarsk Krai, north-central part of Russia.

The lake is located in the Central Siberian Plateau, to the west of the course of the Kotuy river. A tributary of the Kotuy flows out of the southern end of the lake. It has an area of 238 km^{2} (92 sq mi).

== Fauna ==
The lake is rich in fish. The endangered Lake Yessey charr (Salvelinus tolmachoffi), is found in the waters of the lake.

== See also ==
- List of lakes of Russia
