= Yerbogachen =

Yerbogachen Ербогачен
- Selo
- Interactive map of Yerbogachen
- Location of Yerbogachen Yerbogachen (Irkutsk Oblast)
- Coordinates: 61°16′N 108°1′E
- Country: Russia
- Federal subject: Irkutsk Oblast
- Founded: 1860

Population (2010 Census)
  - Total: 1,965
  - Estimate (2012): 1,939 (−1.3%)

Administrative status
  - Capital of: Katangsky District
- Time zone: UTC+8 (MSK+5)
- Postal code: 666610
- OKTMO ID: 25616404101
- Website: erbogachen.ru

Yerbogachen (Russian: Ербогачён), sometimes written Erbogachen or Erbogachene, is a rural locality in Irkutsk Oblast, Russia, located on the Nizhnyaya Tunguska River. It is the administrative center of Katangsky District. Population: 1,965 (2010 census);

== Transportation ==
Yerbogachen is served by Yerbogachen Airport, which offers limited flights to other cities in the region.

== Climate ==
Yerbogachen has a subarctic climate (Köppen climate classification Dfc). Winters are bitterly cold with average temperatures from −34.0 °C (−29.2 °F) to −23.9 °C (−11.0 °F) in January, while summers are warm with average temperatures from 10.8 °C (51.4 °F) to 24.8 °C (76.6 °F) in July. Precipitation is quite low, but is significantly higher in summer than at other times of the year.

Yerbogachen has a climate comparable to that of Sakha, and is probably one of the only locations outside Sakha with a temperature amplitude of 100 °C or 180 °F.

Climate data for Yergobachen
Month	Jan	Feb	Mar	Apr	May	Jun	Jul	Aug	Sep	Oct	Nov	Dec	Year
Record high °C (°F)	−1.0 (30.2)	3.6 (38.5)	11.8 (53.2)	20.3 (68.5)	33.9 (93.0)	38.8 (101.8)	35.8 (96.4)	34.1 (93.4)	30.4 (86.7)	20.1 (68.2)	6.2 (43.2)	3.4 (38.1)	38.8 (101.8)
Mean daily maximum °C (°F)	−23.9 (−11.0)	−17.5 (0.5)	−6.2 (20.8)	3.2 (37.8)	12.1 (53.8)	22.3 (72.1)	24.8 (76.6)	20.9 (69.6)	11.2 (52.2)	−0.5 (31.1)	−15.1 (4.8)	−24.2 (−11.6)	0.6 (33.1)
Daily mean °C (°F)	−29.0 (−20.2)	−25.0 (−13.0)	−14.7 (5.5)	−3.4 (25.9)	6.0 (42.8)	15.2 (59.4)	17.9 (64.2)	14.1 (57.4)	5.5 (41.9)	−4.6 (23.7)	−20.3 (−4.5)	−28.9 (−20.0)	−5.6 (21.9)
Mean daily minimum °C (°F)	−34.0 (−29.2)	−31.7 (−25.1)	−23.1 (−9.6)	−10.7 (12.7)	−0.3 (31.5)	7.7 (45.9)	10.8 (51.4)	7.4 (45.3)	0.7 (33.3)	−8.7 (16.3)	−25.4 (−13.7)	−33.6 (−28.5)	−11.7 (10.9)
Record low °C (°F)	−61.2 (−78.2)	−59.5 (−75.1)	−53.3 (−63.9)	−43.2 (−45.8)	−23.6 (−10.5)	−8.6 (16.5)	−3.4 (25.9)	−6.9 (19.6)	−19.8 (−3.6)	−39.8 (−39.6)	−54.8 (−66.6)	−58.6 (−73.5)	−61.2 (−78.2)
Average precipitation mm (inches)	17 (0.7)	13 (0.5)	14 (0.6)	20 (0.8)	28 (1.1)	47 (1.9)	51 (2.0)	47 (1.9)	39 (1.5)	40 (1.6)	29 (1.1)	21 (0.8)	366 (14.5)
Average rainy days	0	0	1	6	13	16	14	14	15	8	1	0	88
Average snowy days	21	18	16	10	2	0.1	0	0	2	16	22	22	129.1
Average relative humidity (%)	77	75	68	61	57	61	67	74	74	77	79	78	71
Mean monthly sunshine hours	38	115	195	235	257	303	315	231	145	86	58	18	1,996
Source 1: pogoda.ru.net
Source 2: NOAA (sun only, 1961-1990)

== See also ==
- List of airports in Russia
