= Lake Vivi =

Lake in the country of Russia

Vivi Lake
- Location in Krasnoyarsk Krai, Russia Vivi Lake (Krasnoyarsk Krai)
- Location: Evenky District, Central Siberian Plateau
- Coordinates: 66°45′18″N 93°51′00″E
- Primary outflows: Vivi River, length 426 km (265 mi)
- Basin countries: Russia
- Max. length: 88 km (55 mi)
- Max. width: 1.5–5 km (0.93–3.11 mi)
- Surface area: 229 km^{2} (88 sq mi)
- Max. depth: 192 m (630 ft)
- Surface elevation: 253 m (830 ft)
- Settlements: No permanent settlements

Lake Vivi (Russian language: о́зеро Ви́ви) is a lake in Evenkia, Siberia, Russia. The area of the lake is 229 square kilometres (88 sq mi).

The lake is located in a remote area and has no permanent settlements along its banks. It is known for having the geographical center of Russia lying on its southeast shore at 66°25′N 94°15′E. The spot is marked by a 7-metre monument erected in August 1992. Nearby is an even higher cross dedicated to St. Sergius of Radonezh.

== Geography ==
Lake Vivi is located on the southern limit of the Putorana Massif, in the zone where it overlaps with the Syverma Plateau. It is a typical river lake, with the Vivi River, a tributary of the Lower Tunguska, flowing out of it from its southern end. Lake Vivi is roughly stretching from north to south and while its length is ca. 86 kilometres (53 mi), its width does not exceed 5 kilometres (3.1 mi).

== See also ==
- List of lakes of Russia
