= Alitet Nemtushkin =

Evenk poet (1939–2006)

Alitet Nemushkin
- Алитет Немтушкин
- Born: November 12, 1939; Irishki camp, Katangsky District, Irkutsk Oblast, Russian SFSR, Soviet Union
- Died: November 4, 2006 (aged 66); Krasnoyarsk, Krasnoyarsk Krai, Russia
- Occupations: writer, poet, journalist
- Notable work: Земле моей
- Honours: Honoured Cultural Worker of the RSFSR, State Prize of the Russian Federation

My Language
If I forget my native speech
And the songs that my people sing
What use are my eyes and ears?
What use is my mouth?

If I forget the smell of the earth
And do not serve it well
What use are my hands?
Why am I living in the world?

How can I believe the foolish idea
That my language is weak and poor
If my mother’s last words
Were in Evenki?

— From "Bol moya, Evenkiya" Sovetskaya Kultura, July 28, 1988"

Alitet Nikolaevich Nemtushkin (Russian: Алитет Николаевич Немтушкин; 12 November 1939 – 4 November 2006) was an Evenk-Russian poet known for writing in and about his native Evenki language. He has received wide recognition in and outside of Russia, and his work is used by UNESCO to cultivate attention to the problem of language endangerment. He has published more than 31 books of poetry, most of them in Russian, but some in Evenki.
