= Syverma Plateau =

- плато Сыверма
- Location within Krasnoyarsk Krai

Highest point
- Peak: Nakson
- Elevation: 1,035 m (3,396 ft)

Dimensions
- Length: 450 km (280 mi)
- Width: 400 km (250 mi)

Geography
- Country: Russia
- Federal subject: Krasnoyarsk Krai
- Range coordinates: 66°0′N 99°0′E
- Parent range: Central Siberian Plateau
- Borders on: Putorana Plateau

Geology
- Rock age: Triassic
- Rock type: Volcanic rock

Climbing
- Easiest route: From Tura

The Syverma Plateau (Russian: плато Сыверма) is a mountain plateau in Krasnoyarsk Krai, Siberia, Russia. It is a part of the Central Siberian Plateau. The plateau is located in largely uninhabited area.

== Geography ==
The Syverma Plateau is located in central Krasnoyarsk Krai. To the north it merges with the Putorana Mountains and to the west the border with the Tunguska Plateau is not clearly defined. To the east the Syverma Plateau limits with the Vilyuy Plateau. The average height of the plateau is between 600 meters (2,000 ft) and 900 meters (3,000 ft).

The Syverma Plateau is deeply cut by river valleys flowing roughly southwards from the Putorana ranges, such as the Vivi River, Tutonchana, Tembenchi, Embenchime, Kochechum and other right hand tributaries of the Lower Tunguska River.

== Geology ==
Geologically the Syverma Plateau is made up of Triassic volcanic rocks.

== Flora and climate ==
The plateau is covered by larch taiga. Owing to the permafrost trees grow very slowly.

The climate prevailing in the Syverma Plateau is severe, of the subarctic continental type with long, cold winters. In the village of Tura, located at the southern end by the Lower Tunguska River, the average monthly temperature in the winter is −36 °C (−33 °F). Summers are moderately warm with temperatures reaching 16 °C (61 °F) in July. Precipitation is not too heavy, which contributes to the prevalence of permafrost, reaching a depth of over 1,000 meters (3,300 ft) in the plateau area.
