= Baykitsky District =

Coordinates: 61°20′0″N 97°0′0″E

Baykitsky District (Russian: Байкитский район) was a former district (raion), one of the three in the former Evenk Autonomous Okrug, which was merged into Krasnoyarsk Krai on 1 January 2007.

== Location ==
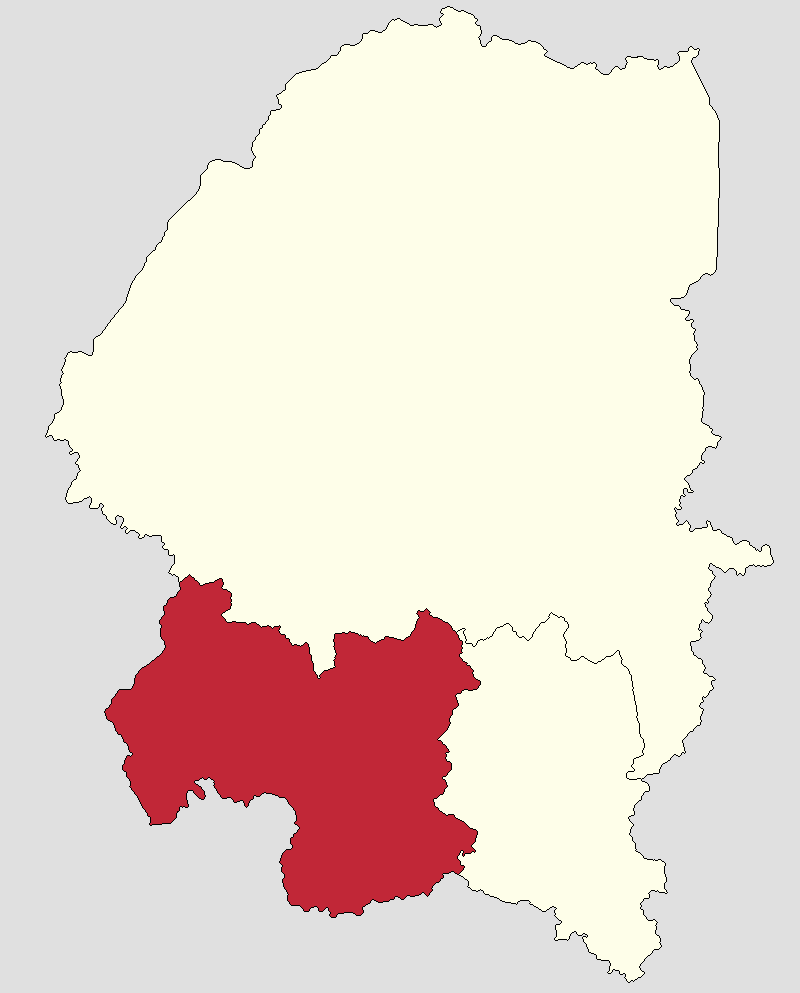
Former Baykitsky district on a map of Evenkia

Baykitsky district was located in the south-western area of the Evenk Autonomous Okrug. The district shared borders with (clockwise from the north) Ilimpiyskiy and Tungussko-Chunsky districts within the Evenk AO, and Boguchansky, Motyginsky, Severo-Yeniseysky, Yeniseysky, and Turukhansky districts of Krasnoyarsk Krai. Thedistrict's total area was 102,000 km^{2} and the administrative centre was the town of Baykit.

== Geography ==
The district was located in the Central Siberian Plateau, around 500–600 metres above sea level, in the middle course of the Podkamennaya Tunguska river – its confluence with the Baikitik can be found in the former area of the district. The highest point of the district was Onot Mountain at 787 metres.

== History ==
Baykitsky district was created in 1927, three years before the creation of Evenk AO. The district was abolished upon the merger of Evenk AO and Krasnoyarsk Krai, on 1 January 2007. It now forms the south-western area of Evenkiysky District.

== Economy ==
=== Infrastructure ===
The district was the centre of industrial development in Evenkia. Within its territory were many gas and oil fields, such as Yurubchenko-Tokhomskoye, Kuyumbinskoye and Omorinskoye. The East Siberian Oil Company, the majority of which was formerly owned by Yukos, is currently actively developing the Yurubchenko-Tokhomskoye field.

An oil refinery with a maximum capacity of 40,000 tons of oil per year is not far away from the oil field . The development of the field and refinery put an end to the energy problems in Baykitsky district.

=== Logging ===
There is a small timber processing industry in the area. Currently it only produces small volumes of timber – only around 10–15 thousand tons of wood. This figure is planned to be increased in the future, going up to 50,000 or possibly 100,000 tons, so that all of Evenkiysky District can be supplied with wood rather than just the former Baykitsky district, and possibly later supplying other regions.

=== Reindeer herding ===
In the past, reindeer herding was well-developed in the area. In just the village of Surinda, there were roughly 15,000 reindeer, and in the village of Poligus, there were up to 10,000. However, in recent years the figure has fallen drastically and the total number of reindeer in the former district has fallen to well under 2,000.

=== Livestock and other foods ===
Some people in the settlements of the former district use livestock and gardening as their occupation. As well as this, fishing and hunting are popular activities in the district, all of which made the district relatively self-sufficient in its needs.

== Demographics ==
=== Settlements ===
Baykitsky district contained 11 settlements, 2 of which are abandoned (postal codes in brackets):

- The town of Baykit (648360) – population 3,343
- The village of Burnyy (648367) – population 194
- The village of Kuyumba (648373) – population 166
- The village of Kuzmovka (648369) – population 193
- The village of Miryuga (648365) – population 43
- The village of Osharovo (648364) – population 96
- The village of Poligus (648371) – population 242
- The village of Sulomay (648368) – population 178
- The village of Surinda (648372) – population 435
- The village of Taimba – abandoned since 2016
- The village of Ust'-Kamo – abandoned since 2016

=== Population ===
The population of the town and 9 inhabited settlements of the former district (since 1939) were:

- 1939: 3,372
- 1959: 2,843
- 1970: 3,349
- 1979: 4,466
- 1989: 6,939
- 2002: 5,819
- 2010: 5,336
