= Vivo Participacoes =

Brazilian communications provider

Vivo Participacoes S.A.
- Formerly: Telesp Celular Participacoes S.A.
- Industry: Telecommunications
- Headquarters: São Paulo, Brazil
- Parent: Brasilcel N.V.

Vivo Participacoes S.A. is a provider of cellular telecommunications services based in São Paulo, Brazil. The company was formerly known as Telesp Celular Participacoes S.A. and is a subsidiary of Brasilcel N.V.
