= Kislokan =

Kislokan Кислокан
- Settlement
- Interactive map of Kislokan
- Coordinates: 62°34′14″N 99°25′23″E
- Country: Russia
- Krai: Krasnoyarsk Krai
- Municipal district: Evenkiysky District
- Rural settlement: Kislokan
- Founded: June 15, 1936

Area
  - Total: 0.73 km^{2} (0.28 sq mi)

Population (2026)
  - Total: 144
  - Density: 200/km^{2} (510/sq mi)
- Time zone: UTC+7 (MSK+4)
- Postal code: 648590
- Telephone code: +7 39170
- Website: kislokan-r04.gosweb.gosuslugi.ru

Kislokan (Russian: Кислокан) is a rural locality (a settlement) in Evenkiysky District of Krasnoyarsk Krai, Russia. It forms the municipal formation of the rural settlement of Kislokan, of which it is the sole settlement. Until 2002, according to the Law on the Administrative-Territorial Structure of the Evenk Autonomous Okrug, it held the status of a village.

== Geography ==
It is located in the eastern part of Evenkiysky District, on the right bank of the Lower Tunguska River, within the Siberian taiga forest zone.

== History ==
The settlement was founded on June 15, 1936, as the Stakhov Amo Simple Production Association (PPO). On March 21, 1951, it was formed by merging three collective farms, with the Stakhov Collective Farm centered at the Kislokan trading post of the Amo nomadic council. On January 3, 1953, the Kislokan Village Council was established.

== Population and Economy ==
As of January 1, 2010, the settlement of Kislokan had a population of 141 people, of whom about 100 were Evenks. The main occupations of the population are hunting and fishing, as well as agriculture (potatoes, vegetables, and grain crops). Kislokan features a branch of the Alitet Nikolayevich Nemtushkin Tura Secondary Boarding School—the Kislokan Primary School and Kindergarten, a paramedic and midwife station, a store, a post office, an airport, and a diesel power plant. Cultural and educational facilities include a library and a community center. A weather station also operates in the settlement. Kislokan covers an area of 73 hectares and has 7 streets.

== Government ==
Head of the Settlement From December 23, 2025, until the formation of the executive authorities of the Evenki Municipal District, the powers of the head are exercised by Andrei Viktorovich Gayulsky.

Heads of the Settlement Anatoly Georgiyevich Kozlov (1937–2017), head from 1990 to 2007. Ivan Petrovich Kolesnichenko, head from 2007 to 2025. Andrei Yuryevich Cherkasov, head from September to December 2025

== Climate ==
The climate in the settlement is temperate continental. The surrounding terrain is predominantly mountainous. The surrounding forests are represented by coniferous trees: spruce, larch, pine, and Siberian cedar. Birch, alder, bird cherry, and rowan are also found. River banks are overgrown with dense herbaceous vegetation.
