= Katangsky District =

Katangsky District Катангский район (Russian)
- District
- View of Yerbogachen

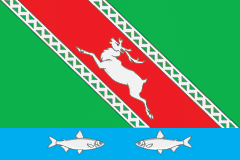
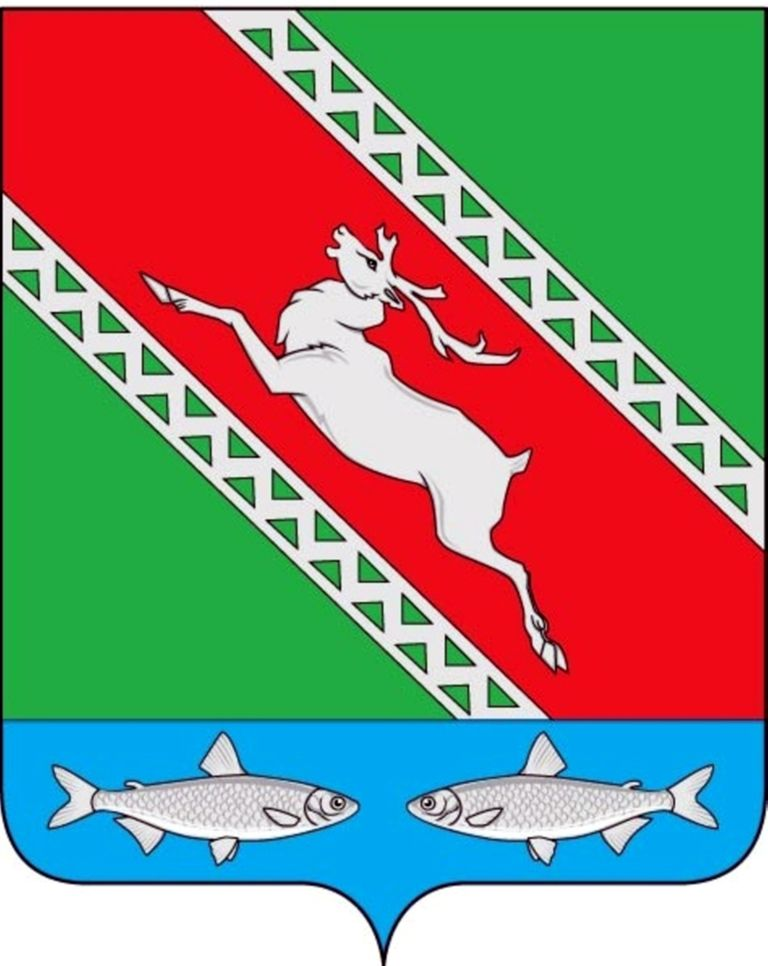
- Flag Coat of arms
- Location of Katangsky District (#13) in Irkutsk Oblast
- Coordinates: 61°N 108°E
- Country: Russia
- Federal subject: Irkutsk Oblast
- Administrative center: Yerbogachen

Area
  - Total: 139,043 km^{2} (53,685 sq mi)

Population (2010 Census)
  - Total: 3,779
  - Density: 0.02718/km^{2} (0.07039/sq mi)
  - Urban: 0%
  - Rural: 100%

Administrative structure
  - Inhabited localities: 15 rural localities

Municipal structure
  - Municipally incorporated as: Katangsky Municipal District
  - Municipal divisions: 0 urban settlements, 4 rural settlements
- Time zone: UTC+8 (MSK+5)
- OKTMO ID: 25616000
- Website: http://xn--80aaal6au7a.xn--p1ai/

Katangsky District (Russian: Катангский райо́н) is an administrative district, one of the thirty-three in Irkutsk Oblast, Russia. Municipally, it is incorporated as Katangsky Municipal District. The area of the district is 139,043 square kilometers (53,685 sq mi). Its administrative center is the rural locality (a selo) of Yerbogachen. Population: 3,779 (2010 census); 4,579 (2002 Census); 9,330 (1989 Soviet census). The population of Yerbogachen accounts for 52.0% of the district's total population.

== History ==
Historically, the district formed part of the now-defunct Preobrazhensky District, the seat of which was the village of Preobrazhenka, Irkutsk Oblast. In 1930, Preobrazhensky District was incorporated into newly formed Evenki National Raion of Katanga. That raion lost its national status prior to 1940, since when it has existed as the Katangsky District.

== Notable people ==
- Alitet Nemtushkin

== See also ==
- Lena Plateau

== Notes ==
=== Sources ===
- Законодательное Собрание Иркутской области. Постановление №9/5-ЗС от 15 апреля 2009 г. «Устав Иркутской области», в ред. Закона №2-У от 14 декабря 2017 г. «О поправках к Уставу Иркутской области». Вступил в силу по истечении десяти дней после дня официального опубликования. Опубликован: "Областная", №45, 24 апреля 2009 г. (Legislative Assembly of Irkutsk Oblast. Resolution #9/5-ZS of April 15, 2009 Charter of Irkutsk Oblast, as amended by the Law #2-U of December 14, 2017 On the Amendments to the Charter of Irkutsk Oblast. Effective as of the day following a ten-day period after the day of the official publication.).
- Законодательное Собрание Иркутской области. Закон №49-ОЗ от 21 июня 2010 г. «Об административно-территориальном устройстве Иркутской области», в ред. Закона №12-ОЗ от 23 марта 2017 г. «О внесении изменений в статьи 25 и 33 Закона Иркутской области "Об административно-территориальном устройстве Иркутской области" и Закон Иркутской области "О порядке рассмотрения Законодательным Собранием Иркутской области предложений о присвоении наименований географическим объектам и (или) о переименовании географических объектов"». Вступил в силу после дня официального опубликования. Опубликован: "Областная", №71, 25 июня 2010 г. (Legislative Assembly of Irkutsk Oblast. Law #49-OZ of June 21, 2010 On the Administrative-Territorial Structure of Irkutsk Oblast, as amended by the Law #12-OZ of March 23, 2017 On Amending Articles 25 and 33 of the Law of Irkutsk Oblast "On the Administrative-Territorial Structure of Irkutsk Oblast" and the Law of Irkutsk Oblast "On the Procedures for Consideration of Assignments of Names to Geographical Objects and (or) Renaming of Geographical Objects". Effective as of after the day of the official publication.).
- Законодательное Собрание Иркутской области. Закон №74-оз от 2 декабря 2004 г. «О статусе и границах муниципальных образований Катангского района Иркутской области», в ред. Закона №6-ОЗ от 6 марта 2013 г. «О распространении действия Закона Иркутской области "О статусе и границах муниципальных образований Катангского района Иркутской области" на территорию нового субъекта Российской Федерации — Иркутской области и внесении в него изменений». Вступил в силу с 31 декабря 2004 г., но не ранее чем через 10 дней со дня официального опубликования. Опубликован: "Восточно-Сибирская правда", №248–249, 14 декабря 2004 г. (Legislative Assembly of Irkutsk Oblast. Law #74-oz of December 2, 2004 On the Status and Borders of the Municipal Formations of Katangsky District of Irkutsk Oblast, as amended by the Law #6-OZ of March 6, 2013 On Expanding the Scope of the Law of Irkutsk Oblast "On the Status and Borders of the Municipal Formations of Katangsky District of Irkutsk Oblast" to the Whole Territory of the New Federal Subject of the Russian Federation—Irkutsk Oblast—and on Amending That Law. Effective as of December 31, 2004, but not earlier than 10 days after the official publication date.).
