= Evenki language =

Tungusic language of eastern Russia and China

Evenki
- Tungus
- Эвэды̄ турэ̄н Evedyy tureen (Russian dialect); Ewengki Gisong (Chinese dialect) ᠧᠸᠡᠩᠺᠢ ᠬᠢᠰᠣᠩ
- Pronunciation: [əwəŋki gisʊŋ]
- Native to: China, Russia
- Region: Inner Mongolia and Heilongjiang in China; most of the Asian part of Russia
- Ethnicity: Evenks
- Native speakers: 24,000 (2024)
- Language family: Tungusic: Northern; Ewenic; Evenki group; Evenki
- Dialects: Solon
- Writing system: Cyrillic, Latin, Mongolian (experimentally)

Language codes
- ISO 639-3: evn
- Glottolog: even1259
- ELP: Evenki
- Glottopedia: (de) Evenki (de)
- Linguasphere: 44-CAA-ba
Current geographic distribution of languages in the Tungusic family, including Evenki
Evenki
- Evenki is classified as Severely Endangered by the UNESCO Atlas of the World's Languages in Danger.

Evenki (/eɪˈvɛŋki/ ay-VEN-kee), (Note: Also spelled Ewenki, Ewenke, or Owenke and previously conflated with Solon or Suolun) or Tungus, (Note: The people speaking Evenki were also called "Tungusy". According to Nedjalkov 1997, p. xix, "Tungus" could be a Chinese exonym.) is the largest member of the northern group of Tungusic languages, a group which also includes Even, Negidal, and the more closely related Oroqen language. The name is sometimes wrongly given as "Evenks". It is spoken by the Evenki or Ewenkī(s) in Russia and China.

In certain areas the influences of the Yakut and the Buryat languages are particularly strong. The influence of Russian in general is overwhelming (in 1979, 75.2% of the Evenkis spoke Russian, rising to 92.7% in 2002). Evenki children were forced to learn Russian at Soviet residential schools, and returned with a "poor ability to speak their mother tongue...". The Evenki language varies considerably among its dialects, which are divided into three large groups: the northern, the southern and the eastern dialects. These are further divided into minor dialects. A written language was created for Evenkis in the Soviet Union in 1931, first using a Latin alphabet, and from 1937 a Cyrillic one. In China, Evenki is written experimentally in the Mongolian script. The language is generally considered endangered. It is presently maintained by young people in only one village, Iyengra, in the southern Sakha Republic.

== Classification ==
Evenki is a member of the Tungusic family. Its similarity to Manchu, the best-documented member of the family, was noted hundreds of years ago, first by botanist P. S. Pallas in the late 18th century, and then in a more formal linguistic study by M. A. Castren in the mid-19th century, regarded as a "pioneer treatise" in the field of Tungusology. The exact internal structure of the Tungusic family is a matter of some debate. Some scholars propose two sub-families: one for Manchu, and another for all the other Tungusic languages, including Evenki. SIL International's Ethnologue divides Tungusic into two sub-families, Northern and Southern, with Evenki alongside Even and Negidal in the Northern sub-family, and the Southern family itself subdivided into Southwestern (among which Manchu) and Southeastern (Nanai and others). Others propose three or more sub-families, or at the extreme a continuum with Manchu at one end and Evenki at the other.

== Dialects ==
Bulatova enumerated 14 dialects and 50 sub-dialects within Russia, spread over a wide geographical area ranging from the Yenisei River to Sakhalin. These may be divided into three major groups primarily on the basis of phonology:

- Evenki
  - Northern (spirant)
    - Ilimpeya: Ilimpeya, Agata and Bol'shoi, Porog, Tura, Tutonchany, Dudinka/Khantai
    - Yerbogachen: Yerbogachen, Nakanno
  - Southern (sibilant)
    - Hushing
      - Sym: Tokma or Upper Nepa, Upper Lena or Kachug, Angara
      - Northern Baikal: Northern Baikal, Upper Lena
    - Hissing
      - Stony Tunguska: Vanavara,Kuyumba, Poligus, Surinda, Taimura or Chirinda, Uchami, Chemdal'sk
      - Nepa: Nepa, Kirensk
      - Vitim-Nercha/Baunt-Talocha: Baunt, Talocha, Tungokochen, Nercha
  - Eastern (sibilant-spirant)
    - Vitim-Olyokma dialect: Barguzin, Vitim/Kalar, Olyokma, Tungir, Tokko
    - Upper Aldan: Aldan, Upper Amur, Amga, Dzheltulak, Timpton, Tommot, Khingan, Chul'man, Chul'man-Gilyui
    - Uchur-Zeya: Uchur, Zeya
    - Selemdzha-Bureya-Urmi: Selemdzha, Bureya, Urmi
    - Ayan-Mai: Ayan, Aim, Mai, Nel'kan, Totti
    - Tugur-Chumikan: Tugur, Chumikan
    - Sakhalin (no subdialects)

Evenks in China also speak several dialects. According to Ethnologue, the Hihue or Hoy dialect is considered the standard; Haila'er, Aoluguya (Olguya), Chenba'erhu (Old Bargu), and Morigele (Mergel) dialects also exist. Ethnologue reports these dialects differ significantly from those in Russia.

Some works focused on individual Russia dialects include Gortsevskaya 1936 (Barguzin), Andreeva 1988 (Tommot), and Bulatova 1999 (Sakhalin).

== Phonology ==
The Evenki language typically has CV syllables but other structures are possible. Bulatova and Grenoble list Evenki as having 11 possible vowel phonemes; a classical five-vowel system with distinctions between long and short vowels (except in /e/) and the addition of a long and short /ə/, while Nedjalkov claims that there are 13 vowel phonemes. Evenki has a moderately small consonant inventory; there are 18 consonants (21 according to Nedjalkov 1997) in the Evenki language and it lacks glides or semivowels.

=== Consonants ===
Below are tables of Evenki consonant phonemes, including those identified by Nedjalkov (1997) in italics.

Evenki consonants (Russian dialects)
		Labial	Dental	Alveolar	Palatal	Velar
Nasal		m	n		ɲ	ŋ
Plosive	voiceless	p	t		tʃ, tʲ	k
Plosive	voiced	b	d		dʒ, dʲ	ɡ
Fricative	voiceless	f		s		x
Fricative	voiced	β, v				ɣ
Approximant		w	l		j	
Trill				r		

The phoneme (/β/) has a word-final allophone, [f], as well as an intervocalic variant, [w]. Likewise, some speakers pronounce intervocalic /s/ as [h]. Speakers of some dialects also alternate /b/ and /β/. Consonant inventories given by researchers working on dialects in China are largely similar. The differences noted: Chaoke and Kesingge et al. give /h/ instead of /x/ and lack /β/, /ɣ/, or /ɲ/; furthermore, Kesingge et al. give /dʐ/ instead of /dʒ/.

Evenki consonants (Chinese dialects)
		Labial	Dental	Alveolar	Post- alveolar	Velar	Glottal
Nasal		m	n			ŋ	
Plosive	voiceless	p	t	ts	tʃ	k	
Plosive	voiced	b	d	dz	dʒ	ɡ	
Fricative		f		s	ʃ	ɣ	h
Approximant		w	l	r	j		

=== Vowels ===
Below is a chart of Evenki vowels found among Russian dialects, including those identified by Nedjalkov (1997) in italics.

Evenki vowels (Russian dialects)
	Front	Back	
	unrounded	unrounded	rounded
Close	i, iː ɪ, ɪː	ɯ	u, uː ʊ, ʊː
Mid	eː je, jeː	ə, əː ɛ, ɛː	o, oː
Open	a, aː		

The vowel inventory of the Chinese dialects of Evenki, however, is markedly different (Chaoke, 1995, 2009):

Evenki vowels (Chinese dialects)
	Front	Central	Back	
	unrounded	rounded	unrounded	rounded
Close	i, iː	ʉ, ʉː		u, uː
Mid	e, eː	ɵ, ɵː	ə, əː	o, oː
Open	a, aː			

Like most Tungusic languages, Evenki employs back-front vowel harmony—suffix vowels are matched to the vowel in the root. However, some vowels – /i, iː, u, uː/ – and certain suffixes no longer adhere to the rules of vowel harmony. Knowledge of the rules of vowel harmony is fading, as vowel harmony is a complex topic for elementary speakers to grasp, the language is severely endangered (Janhunen), and many speakers are multilingual.

=== Syllable structure ===
Possible syllable structures include V, VC, VCC, CV, CVC, and CVCC. In contrast to dialects in Russia, dialects in China do not have /k/, /ŋ/, or /r/ in word-initial position.

== Alphabets ==
=== Russia ===
The creation of the Evenki alphabet began in the 1920s. In May 1928, researcher G. M. Vasilevich prepared for the Evenk students who studied in Leningrad the Memo to Tungus-vacationers. It was a small textbook duplicated on the glass. It used the Vasilyevich Evenki alphabet on a Latin graphic basis. A year later, she compiled the First Book for Reading in the Tungus Language (əwənkil dukuwuntin). This alphabet had the following composition: Aa Bb Çç Чч Dd Ӡӡ Ee Әә Gg Hh Ii Kk Ll Mm Nn Ŋŋ Oo Pp Rr Ss Tt Uu Ww Yy; it also included diacritical marks: a macron to indicate the longitude of the sound and a sub-letter comma to indicate palatalization.

In 1930, it was decided to create a written language for the majority of the peoples of the North of the USSR. The Latin alphabet was chosen as its graphic basis. In the same year, the project of the Evenki alphabet was proposed by Ya. P. Alcor. This project differed from Vasilevich's alphabet only by the presence of letters for displaying Russian borrowings (C c, F f, J j, W w, Z z), as well as using V v instead of W w. After some refinement, the letter Çç was replaced by C c, V v by W w, and the letter Y y was excluded. In May 1931, the Evenki romanized alphabet was officially approved, and in 1932 regular publishing began on it. The basis of the literary language was laid the most studied Nepsky dialect (north of the Irkutsk region).

The official Latinized Evenk alphabet, in which book publishing and schooling were conducted, looked like this:

A a	B в	C c	D d	Ʒ ʒ	E e	Ə ə	Ə̄ ə̄	F f
G g	H h	I i	J j	K k	L l	M m	N n	Ņ ņ
Ŋ ŋ	O o	P p	R r	S s	T t	U u	W w	Z z

Today, the official writing system in Russia for the Evenki language is the Cyrillic script. The script has one additional letter, ӈ, to indicate /ŋ/; it is used only inconsistently in printed works, due to typographical limitations. Boldyrev's dictionary uses ң instead. Some editions use the digraph нг. Other sounds found in Evenki but not Russian, such as /dʒ/, lack devoted letters. Instead д stands in for both /d/ and /dʒ/; when the latter pronunciation is intended, it is followed by one of Cyrillic's iotated letters, similar to the way those letters cause palatalization of the preceding consonant in Russian. However orthographic decisions like these have resulted in some confusion and transfer of Russian phonetics to Evenki among younger speakers. For example, the spellings ди and ды were intended to record [dʒi] and [di] (i.e. the same vowel sound). However, in Russian и and ы are respectively two different vowels, /i/ and /ɨ/. Long vowels are optionally indicated with macrons.

А а	Б б	В в	Г г	Д д	Е е	Ё ё	Ж ж
З з	И и	Й й	К к	Л л	М м	Н н	Ӈ ӈ
О о	П п	Р р	С с	Т т	У у	Ф ф	Х х
Ц ц	Ч ч	Ш ш	Щ щ	Ъ ъ	Ы ы	Ь ь	Э э
Ю ю	Я я

=== China ===
In the "Imperial History of the National Languages of Liao, Jin, and Yuan" (Chinese: 欽定遼金元三史國語解; pinyin: Qīndìng liáo jīn yuán sān shǐ guóyǔ jiě) commissioned by the Qianlong Emperor, the Manchu alphabet is used to write Evenki words.

Evenki in China is now written in the Latin script and experimentally in the Mongolian script. Evenki scholars made an attempt in the 1980s to create standard written forms for their language, using both Mongolian script and a pinyin-like Latin spelling. They published an Evenki–Mongolian–Chinese dictionary (Kesingge, Cidaltu & Alta 1983) with Evenki words spelled in IPA, a pinyin-like orthography, and Mongolian script, as well as a collection of folk songs in IPA and Mongolian script (and Chinese-style numbered musical notation).

The orthographic system developed by Chinese Evenki scholars reflects differences between Evenki and Mongol phonology. It uses both ᠬ and ᠭ (usually romanised from Mongolian as q and ɣ) for /g/. The system uses double letters in both Mongolian and Latin to represent most long vowels; however for /ɔː/ ao is written instead of oo. The same scholars' collection of songs has some orthographic differences from the table below; namely, long vowels are occasionally written not just doubled but also with an intervening silent ᠭ (ɣ), showing clear orthographic influence from the Mongolian language. In medial and final positions, t is written in the Manchu script form ᡨ. Evenki itself is spelled eweŋki, despite Mongolian orthography usually prohibiting the letter combination ŋk. The vowel inventory of this system is also rather different from that of Chaoke (1995, 2009).

ᠠ a /a/	ᠡ e /ə/	ᠢ y*, i /i/	ᠣ o /ʊ/	ᠤ ō /ɔ/	ᠥ u /o/	ᠦ u /u/	ᠧ* e /ə/
ᠨ n /n/	ᠩ ng /ŋ/	ᠪ b /b/	ᠫ p /p/	ᠬ g /ɡ/	ᠭ ḡ /ɣ/	ᠮ m /m/	ᠯ l /l/
ᠰ s /s/	ᠱ x, sh /ʃ/	ᠲ t /t/	ᠳ d /d/	ᠴ q, ch /tʃ/	ᠵ j, zh /dʐ/	ᠶ y /j/	ᠷ r /r/
ᠸ w /w/	ᠹ f /f/	ᠺ k /k/	ᠾ h /h/	* used only word-initially

Du (2007) uses a different version of Latin script, which distinguishes certain vowels and consonants more clearly than the system of Kesingge et al.:

A a /a/	B b /b/	C c /ts/	D d /d/	E e /ə/	Ē ē /e/	F f /f/	G g /ɡ/	Ḡ ḡ /ɣ/
H h /x. h/	I i /i/	J j /dʒ/	K k /k/	L l /l/	M m /m/	N n /n/	Ng ng /ŋ/, /ˠ/
Ɵ ō /ɔ/	O o /ʊ/	P p /p/	Q q /tʃ/	R r /r/	S s /s/	T t /t/
U u /u/	V v /ɵ/	W w /w/	X x /ʃ/	Y y /j/	Z z /dz/

== Morphology ==
Evenki is highly agglutinating and suffixing: Each morpheme is easily recognizable and carries only one piece of meaning. Evenki pronouns distinguish between singular and plural as well as inclusive and exclusive in the first person. The Evenki language has a rich case system — 13 cases, though there is some variation among dialects — and it is a nominative–accusative language. Evenki differentiates between alienable and inalienable possession: alienable possession marks the possessor in the nominative case and the possessum in the possessed case, while inalienable possession is marked by personal indices.

Evenki personal indices
	Singular	Plural
1st person	-v	-vun (exclusive) -t (inclusive)
2nd person	-s, -si, -ni	-sun
3rd person	-n, -in	-tyn

Below is a table of cases and suffixes in Evenki, following Nedjalkov (1997):

Evenki cases and suffixes
Case		Suffix	Example
Nominative		–	asatkan 'the girl'
Accusative	indefinite	-ja	e-ja 'what?'
Accusative	definite	-va, -ma	bi kete-ve himmikte-ve tevle-che-v I much-ACD cowberry-ACD gather-PST-1SG 'I gathered much cowberry'
Accusative	reflexive-genitive definite	-vi (sg.), -ver (pl.)	hute-kle-vi child-LOCDIR-REF 'to/for [her] own child'
"Old genitive" unproductive		-ngi	e:kun-ngi who-GEN 'whose?'
Ablative		-duk	e:kun-duk who-ABL 'from whom/where?'
Locative	Locative-Directive	-kle, ikle	hute-kle child-LOCDIR 'for the child'
Locative	Dative-Locative	-du, -tu	tatkit-tu school-DAT 'at/in school'
Locative	Allative-Locative	-tki, -tyki	agi-tki forest-ALLLOC '(in)to the forest'
Locative	Allative	-la	d'u-la house-ALL '[enter] into the house'
Locative	Elative	-ditk	oron-ditk reindeer-ELA 'from the reindeer'
Prolative		-li, -duli	nadalla-li week-PRO in a week's time singilgen-duli snow-PRO 'in the snow'
Instrumental		-t, -di	pektyre:vun-di gun-INS 'with the gun'
Possessed		-gali, -chi, -lan, -tai	muri-chi beje horse-POS man 'a man with a horse; a horseman'
Semblative case		-ngachin, -gechin	lang-ngachin trap-SEM 'like a trap'

Plurals are marked with -il-, -l-, or -r- before the case marker, if any:

tyge-l-ve
cup-PL-ACD
'the cups (accusative)'

Ivul-ngi oro-r-in
Ivul-GEN reindeer-PL-3SG.POSS
'the reindeer (pl.) of Ivul.'

== Syntax ==
Evenki is a subject–object–verb and head-final language. The subject is marked according to the nominative case, and the object is in the accusative. In Evenki, the indirect object precedes the direct object.

== Literary traditions ==
The Manchu script was used to write Evenki (Solon) words in the "Imperial History of the National Languages of Liao, Jin, and Yuan". The Evenki did not have their own writing system until the introduction of the Latin script in 1931 and the subsequent change to Cyrillic in 1936–7. The literary language was first based on the Nepa dialect of the Southern subgroup, but in the 1950s was redesigned with the Stony Tunguska dialect as its basis. Ethnographer S. M. Shirokogoroff harshly criticised the "child-like" literary language, and in a 1930s monograph predicted it would quickly go extinct. Although textbooks through the 8th grade have been published, "Literary Evenki has not yet achieved the status of a norm which cut across dialects and is understood by speakers of some dialects with great difficulty". However, despite its failure to gain widespread acceptance, within its dialectal base of roughly 5,000 people, it survived and continues in use up to the present. Since the 1930s, "folklore, novels, poetry, numerous translations from Russian and other languages", textbooks, and dictionaries have all been written in Evenki. In Tura (former administrative center of the Evenk Autonomous Okrug), the local newspaper includes a weekly supplement written in Evenki.

== Language shift and multilingualism ==
There is a large quantity of Russian loan words in Evenki, especially for technologies and concepts that were introduced by the Russian pioneers in Siberia. "Evenki is spoken in regions with heavy multilingualism. In their daily life the people come into contact with Russian, Buriat and Yakut, and each of these languages had affected the Evenki language. Russian is the lingua franca of the region, part of the Evenki population is bilingual, and part trilingual. All Evenki know Russian relatively well." In 1998 there were approximately 30,000 ethnic Evenkis living in Russia and about 1/3 of them spoke the language. Even a decade ago Bulatova was trying to warn speakers and linguists alike: "There is widespread loss of Evenki and the language can be considered seriously endangered". According to the 2002 Russian census, there were 35,527 citizens of the Russian Federation who identified themselves as ethnically Evenki, but only 7,580 speakers of the language. In 2021, there were 39,226 people who identified themselves as Evenki, but only 5,831 speakers of the language.

In China, there is an ethnic population of 30,500 but only 19,000 are fluent in Evenki and only around 3,000 people are monolingual in Evenki. Juha Janhunen investigated multilingualism in Hulunbuir (northern Inner Mongolia) and the adjoining section of Heilongjiang (e.g. Qiqihar) in 1996. He found that most Solons still spoke Evenki, and about half knew the Daur language as well. Furthermore, Mongolian functioned as a lingua franca among members of all minority groups there, as they tended to do their education in Mongolian-medium schools. The only Evenki-speakers whom Janhunen knew not to speak Mongolian as a second language were the Reindeer Evenki (sometimes called "Yakut") in the northern part of Hulunbuir, who used Russian as their "language of intercultural communication". Janhunen predicted that all of these languages, including Mongolian, were likely to lose ground to Chinese in coming years. However Chaoke noted more than a decade later that the usage rate of Evenki remained quite high, and that it was still common to find Evenki speakers who were proficient in three, four, or even five languages.

There is a small population of Mongolized Hamnigan speakers of the Hamnigan dialect of Buryat in Mongolia as well, numbering around 1,000.

There is little information regarding revival efforts or Evenki's status now. In 1998, the language was taught in preschools and primary schools and offered as an option in 8th grade. The courses were regarded as an 'ethnocultural component' to bring Evenki language and culture into the curriculum. Instruction as a second language is also available in the Institute of the Peoples of the North at Herzen University (the former St. Petersburg State Pedagogical University). In the 1980s, Christian missionaries working in Siberia translated the Bible into Evenki and a Christian group called the Global Recordings Network recorded Christian teaching materials in Evenki.

== Sample text ==
Article 1 of the Universal Declaration of Human Rights:

Упкат илэл ты̄нмукирди, урэ̄лди мэ̄нӈи са̄рича̄ди балдыдяра. Нуӈартын дялитви, һалдяндыви биси, мэмэгӣлвэр аяралды̄дяна тэдет о̄мамачитын.
Upkat ilel tīnmukirḑi, urēlḑi mēnŋi sāričāḑi baldiḑara. Nuŋartin ḑalitvi, halḑandivi bisi, memegīlver ayaraldīḑana teḑet ōmamačitin.
