= Tungussko-Chunsky District =

Tungussko-Chunsky district was a former district (raion) of the former Evenk Autonomous Okrug which was merged into Krasnoyarsk Krai on 1 January 2007.

== Location ==
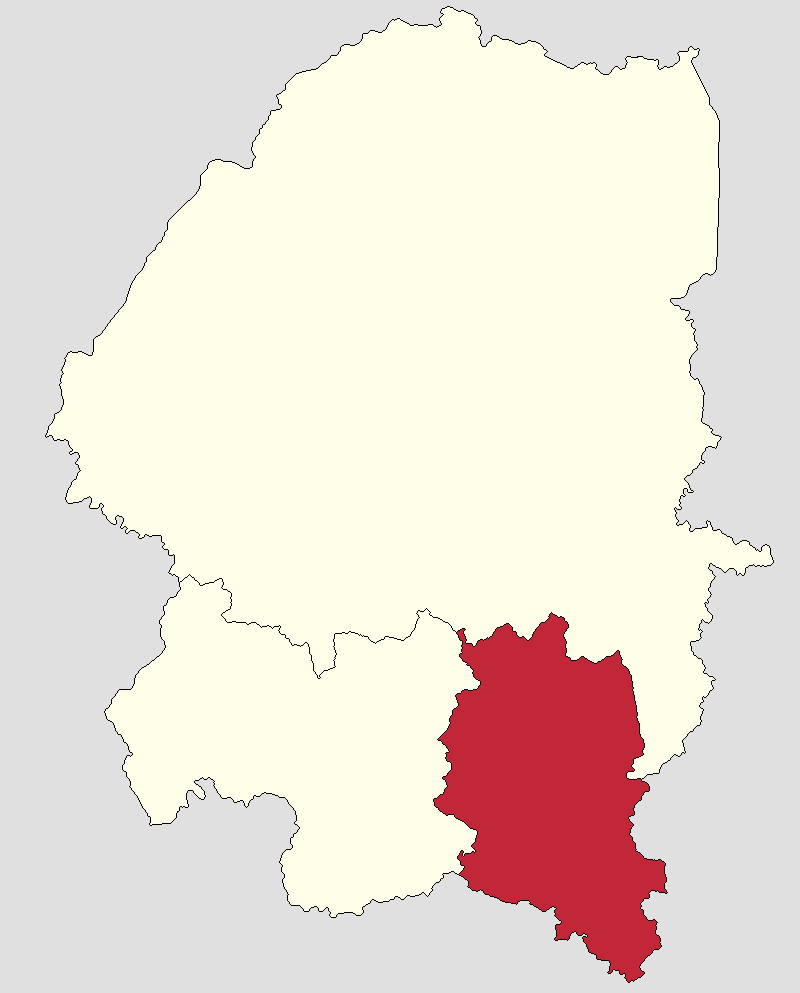
Former Tungussko-Chunsky district on a map of Evenkia

Tungussko-Chunsky district was located in the south-east of the Evenk Autonomous Okrug. The total area of the district was 111,600km^{2} - the district's length from west to east at the widest point was 340 kilometres, and from north to south was 540 kilometres.

When the district was created, the administrative centre was the village of Strelka-Chunya. However, in 1935, the administrative centre was changed to the village of Vanavara. The reason for the change was the distance of Strelka-Chunya from the district's main waterway, Podkammenoy Tunguski, which caused difficulties in communication with other settlements in the district.

The district contained 5 settlements (postal codes in parentheses):

- The village of Vanavara (648490) - population 2,943
- The village of Mutoray (648483) - population 90
- The village of Oskoba (648484) - population 13
- The village of Strelka-Chunya (648482) - population 184
- The village of Chemdalsk (648481) - population 51

The distances of the other settlements from Vanavara vary between 160 kilometres and 200 kilometres.

== History ==
In 1908, before the creation of the district, the area which it later controlled was the epicentre of the Tunguska event.

== Population ==
The population of the town and 9 settlements of the former district (since 1939) were:

- 1939: 1,869
- 1959: 2,229
- 1970: 2,037
- 1979: 2,547
- 1989: 6,346
- 2002: 3,709
- 2010: 3,479
