= Evenk Autonomous Okrug =

Former federal subject of Russia

Coordinates: 64.0000°N 100.0000°E

Evenk Autonomous Okrug Эвенкийский автономный округ (Russian)
- Autonomous Okrug

Other transcription(s)
  - Evenki: Эведы автономды округ
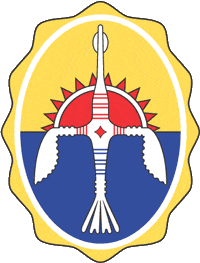
- Flag Coat of arms

- Country: Russia
- Federal district: Siberian
- Economic region: East Siberian
- Established: 10 December 1930
- Capital: Tura

Government
  - Body: Legislative Assembly
  - Last Governor: Boris Zolotaryov

Area
  - Total: 763,197 km^{2} (294,672 sq mi)
  - Rank: 7th

Population
  - Estimate (2007): 16,979
- Time zone: UTC+7 (MSK+4)
- Official languages: Russian; Recognised minority language: Evenk

Evenk Autonomous Okrug, (Note: Russian: Эвенкийский автономный округ, Evenkiysky avtonomny okrug; Evenki: Эведы автономды округ, Ēvēde avtōnōmde okrug) or Evenkia, (Note: Russian: Эвенкия; Russian pronunciation: [ɛvʲɪnˈkʲiɪə]) was a federal subject of Russia (an autonomous okrug of Krasnoyarsk Krai). It had been created in 1930. Its administrative center was the urban-type settlement of Tura. As of 2006, at 767,600 km^{2}, it was Russia's seventh largest federal subject, and the country's least populous: 17,697 (2002 census).

In 1999, the governor of Krasnoyarsk, General Alexander Lebed, demanded the okrug recognize the central district government of Krasnoyarsk had authority over it, which the okrug refused to do, causing a power struggle between the central district and the okrug's government.

Following a referendum on the issue held on April 17, 2005, Evenk and Taymyr Autonomous Okrugs were merged into Krasnoyarsk Krai effective January 1, 2007. Administratively, they are now considered to be districts with special status within Krasnoyarsk Krai; municipally, they have a status of municipal districts (see Evenkiysky District).

Boris Zolotaryov was the last governor of the autonomous okrug.

== Administrative divisions ==
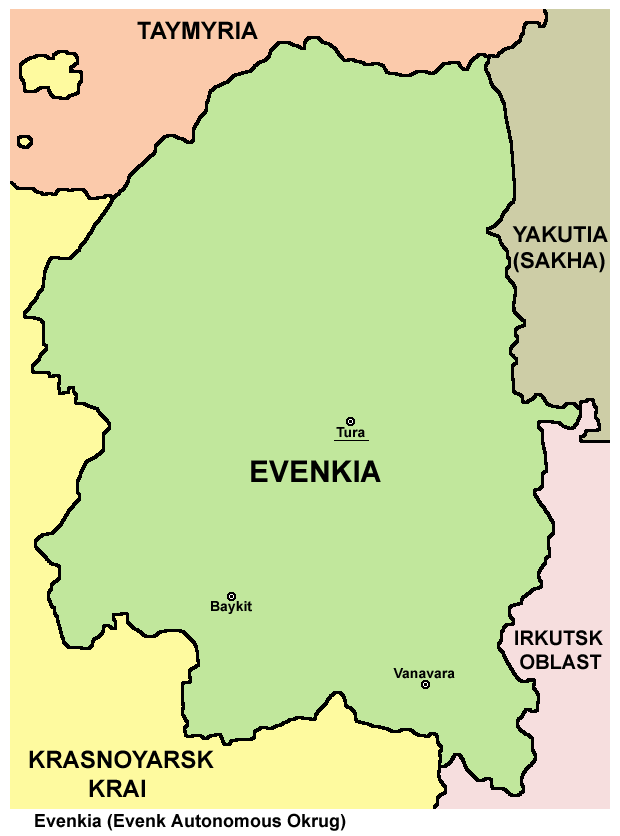
Map of Evenkia

Before 2007, Evenk AO contained three districts:

- Baykitsky District
- Ilimpiyskiy District
- Tungussko-Chunsky District

== Demographics ==
=== Population ===
(2002): 17,697.

=== Vital statistics ===
Source: Russian Federal State Statistics Service

	Average population (x 1000)	Live births	Deaths	Natural change	Crude birth rate (per 1000)	Crude death rate (per 1000)	Natural change (per 1000)
1970	13	314	144	170	24.2	11.1	13.1
1975	15	254	159	95	16.9	10.6	6.3
1980	17	373	167	206	21.9	9.8	12.1
1985	22	521	219	302	23.7	10.0	13.7
1990	24	514	189	325	21.3	7.8	13.5
1991	24	427	221	206	17.7	9.1	8.5
1992	24	414	249	165	17.5	10.5	7.0
1993	23	297	270	27	13.1	11.9	1.2
1994	21	294	257	37	13.9	12.1	1.7
1995	20	299	214	85	14.8	10.6	4.2
1996	20	269	223	46	13.5	11.2	2.3
1997	20	261	202	59	13.3	10.3	3.0
1998	19	244	220	24	12.7	11.4	1.2
1999	19	251	203	48	13.4	10.8	2.6
2000	18	242	214	28	13.3	11.7	1.5
2001	18	274	234	40	15.3	13.1	2.2
2002	18	263	237	26	14.9	13.4	1.5
2003	18	274	215	59	15.6	12.3	3.4
2004	17	267	218	49	15.4	12.6	2.8
2005	17	283	259	24	16.5	15.1	1.4
2006	17	282	236	46	16.6	13.9	2.7

=== Ethnic groups ===
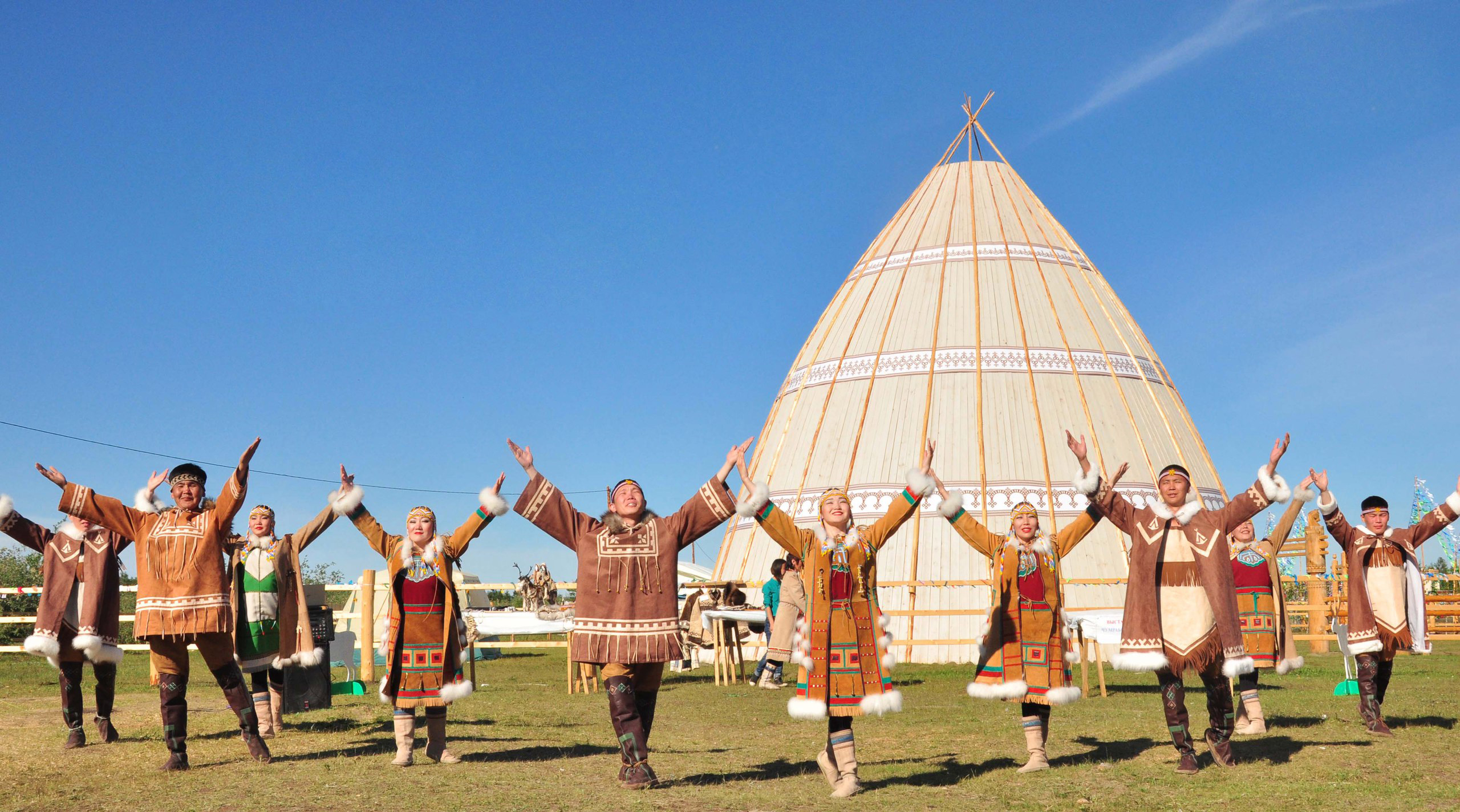
Evenks are native to Evenkia, as well as Yakutia & beyond.

Of the 17,697 residents (as of the 2002 census) 2 (0.01%) chose not to specify their ethnic background. Of the rest, residents identified themselves as belonging to 67 ethnic groups, including ethnic Russians (62%), Evenks (21.5%), Yakuts (5.6%), Ukrainians (3.1%), Kets (1.2%), 162 Tatars (0.9%), 152 Khakas (0.9%) and 127 Volga Germans (0.7%).

Ethnic group	1939 census		1959 census		1970 census		1979 census		1989 census		2002 census	
Ethnic group	Number	%	Number	%	Number	%	Number	%	Number	%	Number	%
Evenks	3,721	39.3%	3,474	33.7%	3,207	25.3%	3,239	20.3%	3,480	14.0%	3,802	21.5%
Yakuts	713	7.5%	51	0.5%	781	6.2%	822	5.1%	937	3.8%	991	5.6%
Kets			14	0.1%	142	1.1%	154	1.0%	150	0.6%	211	1.2%
Russians	4,675	49.4%	5,975	57.9%	7,732	61.1%	10,400	65.1%	16,718	67.5%	10,958	61.9%
Ukrainians	117	1.2%	196	1.9%	254	2.0%	472	3.0%	1,303	5.3%	550	3.1%
Others	234	2.5%	610	5.9%	542	4.3%	881	5.5%	2,181	8.8%	1,185	6.7%

== Governors ==
No.	Portrait	Name (lifespan)	Tenure	Time in office	Party	Election
1		Anatoly Yakimov (1949–2013)	18 December 1991 – 4 April 1997 (lost election)	5 years, 107 days	Independent	Appointed
2		Aleksandr Bokovikov (1956–2010)	4 April 1997 – 22 April 2001 (retired)	4 years, 18 days	Our Home – Russia → Unity	1996 (annulled) 1997
3		Boris Zolotaryov (born 1953)	22 April 2001 – 31 December 2006 (autonomy dissolved)	5 years, 253 days	Independent → United Russia	2001; 2005 (Note: Appointed by the president of Russia with the consent of the Legislative Assembly.)

== See also ==
- Music of Evenkia
