= Tura, Krasnoyarsk Krai =

Tura Тура
- Settlement

Other transcription(s)
  - Evenki: Typy
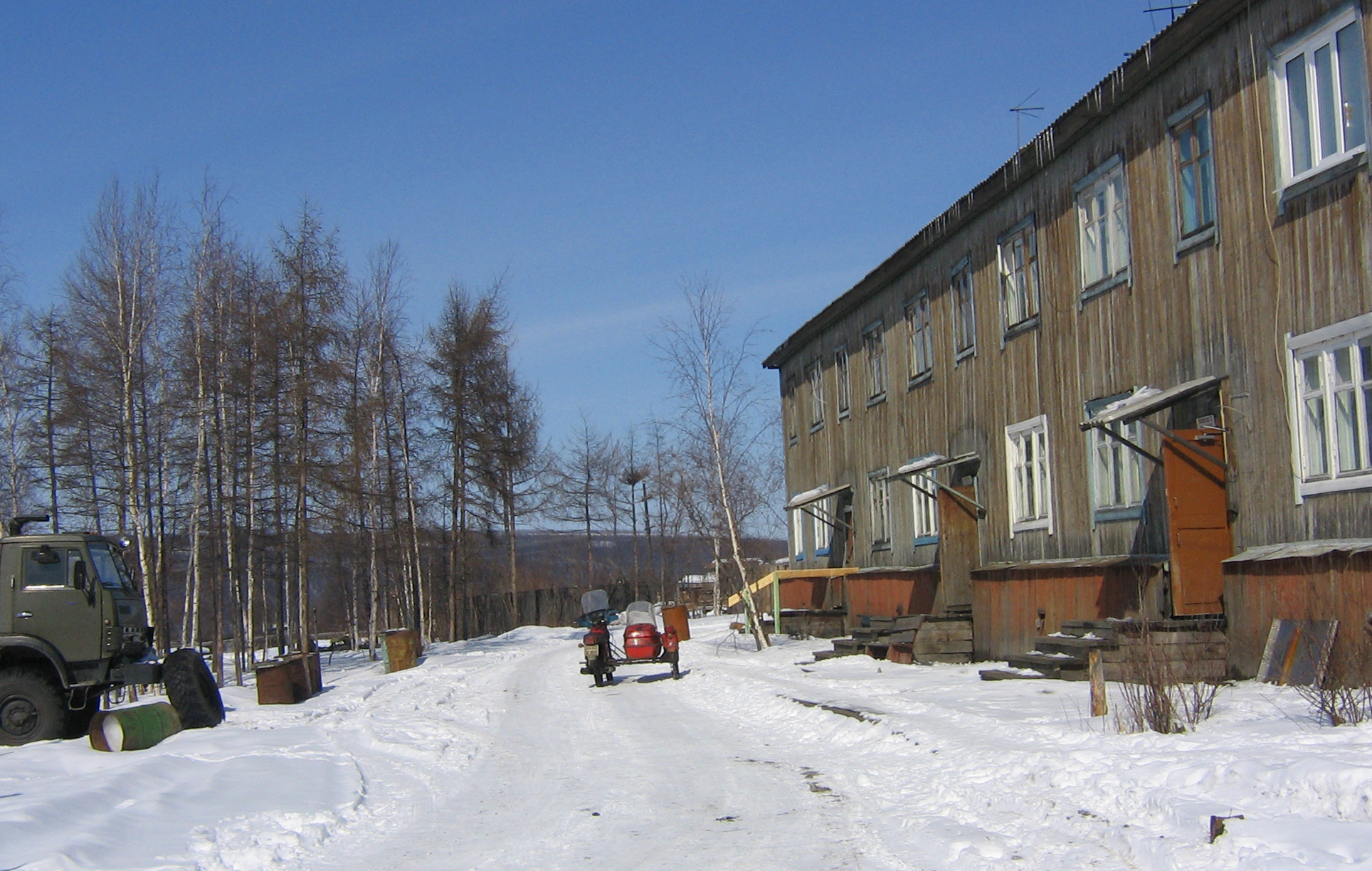
- Uvachan Street

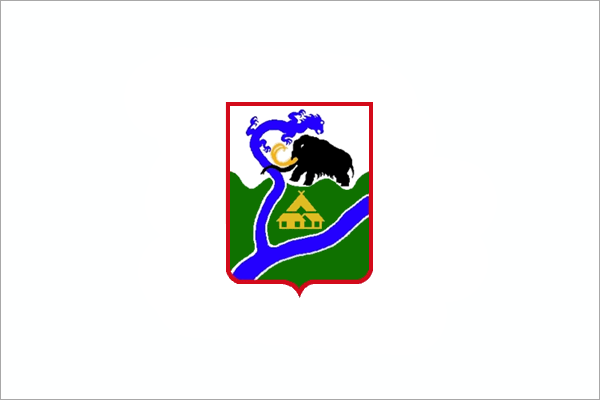
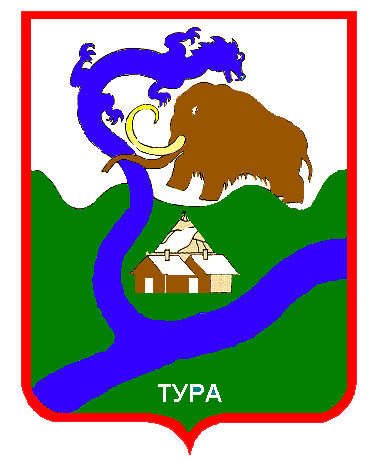
- Flag Coat of arms
- Interactive map of Tura
- Location of Tura Tura (Krasnoyarsk Krai)
- Coordinates: 64°17′N 100°13′E
- Country: Russia
- Federal subject: Krasnoyarsk Krai
- Administrative district: Evenkiysky District
- Founded: 1927
- Elevation: 209 m (686 ft)

Population (2010 Census)
  - Total: 5,535
  - Estimate (2025): 4,377 (−20.9%)

Administrative status
  - Capital of: Evenkiysky District
- Time zone: UTC+7 (MSK+4)
- Postal code: 648000
- Dialing code: +7 39113
- OKTMO ID: 04650402101

Tura (Russian: Тура́; Evenki: Typy, Turu) is a rural locality (a settlement) and the administrative center of Evenkiysky District of Krasnoyarsk Krai, Russia, in the Syverma Plateau, at the confluence of the Kochechum and the Nizhnyaya Tunguska Rivers. The population was 5,535 (2010 census); 5,836 (2002 census); 7,474 (1989 Soviet census).

Historical population
Year	Pop.	±%
1939	1,573	—
1959	2,039	+29.6%
1970	3,528	+73.0%
1979	5,507	+56.1%
1989	7,474	+35.7%
2002	5,836	−21.9%
2010	5,535	−5.2%
2021	4,440	−19.8%
Source: Census data

== History ==
Tura was the administrative center of Evenk Autonomous Okrug before the okrug was merged into Krasnoyarsk Krai on January 1, 2007. Until April 2011, it had urban-type settlement status.

== Climate ==
Tura has a very cold subarctic climate (Köppen Dfc) with short, but warm and rainy summers with cool nights and long, bitterly cold winters with little sunshine.

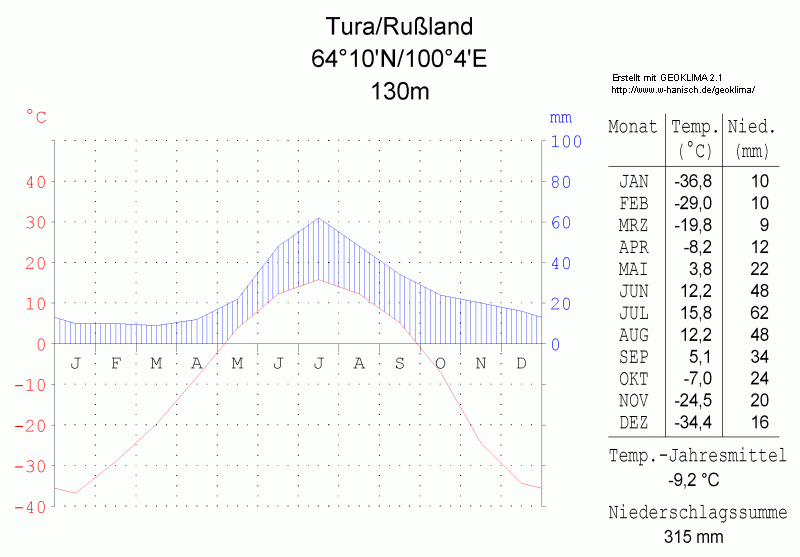
Climate Diagram

Climate data for Tura
Month	Jan	Feb	Mar	Apr	May	Jun	Jul	Aug	Sep	Oct	Nov	Dec	Year
Record high °C (°F)	−1.2 (29.8)	3.3 (37.9)	9.3 (48.7)	18.5 (65.3)	31.3 (88.3)	37.6 (99.7)	38.8 (101.8)	32.6 (90.7)	26.0 (78.8)	17.2 (63.0)	6.5 (43.7)	3.0 (37.4)	38.0 (100.4)
Mean daily maximum °C (°F)	−29.9 (−21.8)	−23.3 (−9.9)	−8.3 (17.1)	1.7 (35.1)	10.0 (50.0)	20.9 (69.6)	24.2 (75.6)	19.4 (66.9)	10.4 (50.7)	−2.2 (28.0)	−19.4 (−2.9)	−28.9 (−20.0)	−2.1 (28.2)
Daily mean °C (°F)	−34 (−29)	−29.1 (−20.4)	−16.3 (2.7)	−5 (23)	4.2 (39.6)	14.1 (57.4)	17.2 (63.0)	13.1 (55.6)	5.1 (41.2)	−6.1 (21.0)	−23.8 (−10.8)	−32.8 (−27.0)	−7.8 (18.0)
Mean daily minimum °C (°F)	−37.9 (−36.2)	−34 (−29)	−23.3 (−9.9)	−11.7 (10.9)	−1.4 (29.5)	7.3 (45.1)	10.7 (51.3)	7.9 (46.2)	1.1 (34.0)	−9.5 (14.9)	−27.7 (−17.9)	−36.7 (−34.1)	−12.9 (8.7)
Record low °C (°F)	−58.9 (−74.0)	−59.2 (−74.6)	−50.7 (−59.3)	−41.6 (−42.9)	−27.1 (−16.8)	−5.8 (21.6)	−1.5 (29.3)	−5.5 (22.1)	−15.6 (3.9)	−39.1 (−38.4)	−52 (−62)	−60 (−76)	−60 (−76)
Average precipitation mm (inches)	15.6 (0.61)	12.4 (0.49)	12.0 (0.47)	17.0 (0.67)	35.4 (1.39)	45.9 (1.81)	55.6 (2.19)	68.0 (2.68)	37.9 (1.49)	32.3 (1.27)	23.6 (0.93)	18.5 (0.73)	374.2 (14.73)
Average rainy days	0	0	0.3	4	13	18	16	19	16	6	0.2	0	91
Average snowy days	24	21	21	14	5	0.2	0	0.1	3	21	24	24	156
Average relative humidity (%)	77	76	70	63	58	59	65	73	75	78	78	77	71
Mean monthly sunshine hours	8	60	167	222	240	264	288	185	107	72	29	3	1,645
Source 1: pogoda.ru.net
Source 2: NOAA (sun only, 1961-1990)
