= Evenkiysky District =

Evenkiysky District Эвенкийский район (Russian)
- District

Other transcription(s)
  - Evenk: Эведы район
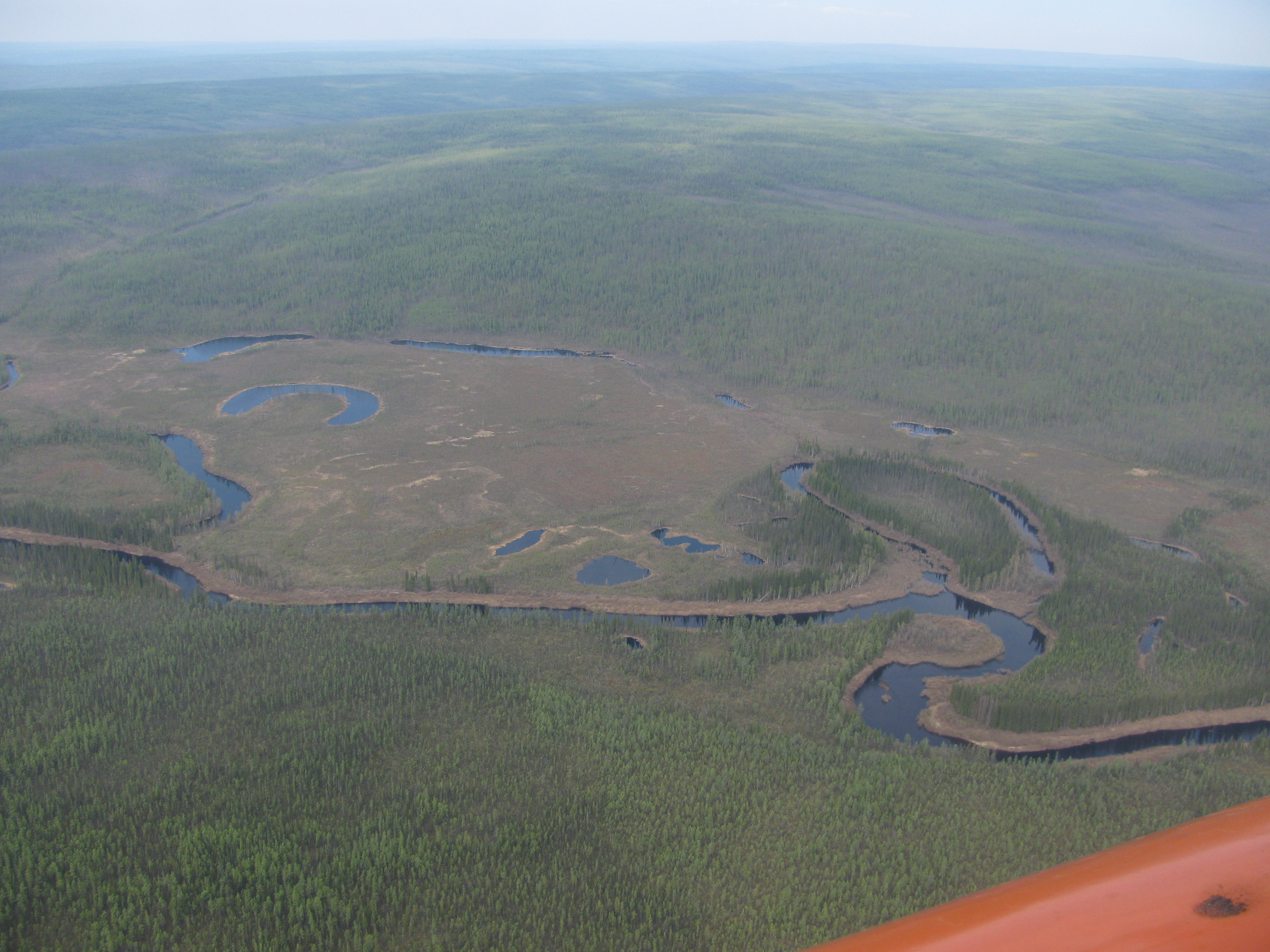
- Taiga in Evenkiysky District

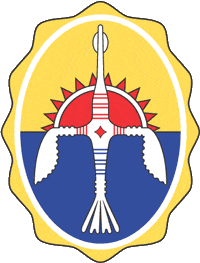
- Flag Coat of arms
- Anthem: Anthem of Evenkiysky Municipal District
- Location of Evenkiysky District in Krasnoyarsk Krai
- Coordinates: 65°N 98°E
- Country: Russia
- Federal subject: Krasnoyarsky Krai
- Established: December 4, 2006
- Administrative center: Tura

Government
  - Type: Local government
  - Body: Evenkiysky District Council of Deputies
  - Head: Andrey V. Gayulsky

Area
  - Total: 763,200 km^{2} (294,700 sq mi)

Population (2010 Census)
  - Total: 16,253
  - Density: 0.02130/km^{2} (0.05516/sq mi)
  - Urban: 34.1%
  - Rural: 65.9%

Administrative structure
  - Inhabited localities: 25 rural localities

Municipal structure
  - Municipally incorporated as: Evenkiysky Municipal District
  - Municipal divisions: 0 urban settlements, 23 rural settlements
- Time zone: UTC+7 (MSK+4)
- OKTMO ID: 04650000
- Website: https://evenkya.gosuslugi.ru/

Evenkiysky District (Russian: Эвенки́йский райо́н, Evenki: Эведы район, romanized: Evedy rayon), or Evenkia (Russian: Эвенкия), is an administrative and municipal district (raion), one of the forty-three in Krasnoyarsky Krai, Russia. Before 1 January 2007, it was split into three different districts - Baykitsky, Ilimpiyskiy and Tungussko-Chunsky - as the Evenk Autonomous Okrug—a federal subject (an autonomous okrug) of Russia.

It is located in the central and eastern parts of the krai and borders with Taymyrsky Dolgano-Nenetsky District in the north, the Sakha Republic and Irkutsk Oblast in the east, Kezhemsky, Boguchansky, Motyginsky, and Severo-Yeniseysky Districts & Yeniseysky District in the south, and with Turukhansky District in the west. The area of the district is 763,200 square kilometers (294,700 sq mi). Its administrative center is the rural locality (a settlement) of Tura.

Population: 16,253 (2010 census); 17,697 (2002 census); 24,409 (1989 Soviet census). The population of Tura accounts for 34.1% of the district's total population.

== Geography ==
River Arga-Sala, the largest tributary of the Olenyok, has its sources in the district. Lake Yessey and Suringda are among of the largest in the area. The southeastern coast of Lake Vivi is a geographical center of Russia.

== History ==
The district was founded on December 4, 2006.

On 15 March 2019 there was a meteorite that made headlines, called the New Tunguska meteorite. A piece was recovered from the bottom of the Podkamennaya Tunguska River near the village of Uchami in the Krasnoyarsk region. The location is 420 kilometres from the site of the large Tunguska Event of 1908.

== Government ==
As of 2026, the Head of the district is Andrey V. Gayulsky.

== Demographics ==
=== Vital statistics ===
Source: Russian Federal State Statistics Service

	Average population (x 1000)	Live births	Deaths	Natural change	Crude birth rate (per 1000)	Crude death rate (per 1000)	Natural change (per 1000)
2007	17	304	233	71	18.1	13.9	4.2
2008	17	290	240	50	17.4	14.4	3.0
2009	16	305	243	62	18.5	14.7	3.8
2010	16	296	213	83	18.1	13.0	5.1

=== Ethnic groups ===
The indigenous people of the region represents above 36.2% of the population. Of the 17,697 residents (as of the 2002 Census), 2 (0.01%) chose not to specify their ethnic background. Of the rest, residents identified themselves as belonging to 67 ethnic groups, including ethnic Russians (62%), Evenks (21.5%), Yakuts (5.6%), Ukrainians (3.1%), Kets (1.2%), 162 Tatars (0.9%), 152 Khakas (0.9%) and 127 Volga Germans (0.7%).

Ethnic group	1939 Census		1959 Census		1970 Census		1979 Census		1989 Census		2002 Census		2010 Census		2021 Census	
Ethnic group	Number	%	Number	%	Number	%	Number	%	Number	%	Number	%	Number	%	Number	%
Russians	4,675	49.4%	5,975	57.9%	7,732	61.1%	10,400	65.1%	16,718	67.5%	10,958	61.9%	9,662	61.5%	7,379	57.9
Evenks	3,721	39.3%	3,474	33.7%	3,207	25.3%	3,239	20.3%	3,480	14.0%	3,802	21.5%	3,583	22.8%	3,118	24.4
Yakuts	713	7.5%	51	0.5%	781	6.2%	822	5.1%	937	3.8%	991	5.6%	939	5.9%	996	7.8
Ukrainians	117	1.2%	196	1.9%	254	2.0%	472	3.0%	1,303	5.3%	550	3.1%	341	2.1%	161	1.2
Kets			14	0.1%	142	1.1%	154	1.0%	150	0.6%	211	1.2%	207	1.3%	253	1.9
Others	234	2.5%	610	5.9%	542	4.3%	881	5.5%	2,181	8.8%	1,185	6.7%	915	5.8%	804	6.3

Historical population
Year	Pop.	±%
1939	9,460	—
1959	10,320	+9.1%
1970	12,658	+22.7%
1979	15,710	+24.1%
1989	24,409	+55.4%
2002	17,697	−27.5%
2010	16,253	−8.2%
2021	13,404	−17.5%
Source: Census data
