= Bakhta =

Bakhta may refer to:

== Places ==
- Bakhta (river), Russia
- Bakhta (Turukhansky district), a village in Russia
- Talwandi Bakhta, a village in Punjab, India
- Kot Bakhta, a village in Punjab, India

== People ==
- Ali Bakhta, Algerian sportsman

== See also ==
- Bhakta or bhakt, a Sanskrit term for a devotee
- Bhakt (pejorative), pejorative term for supporters of the Bharatiya Janata Party in India
