= Vyacheslav Shishkov bibliography =

The bibliography of Vyacheslav Shishkov (1873-1946) includes three novels, four novellas, eleven plays, a large number of short stories and several works of non-fiction.

== Notable works by Vyacheslav Shishkov ==
=== Novels and novellas ===
Title	Year of publication	Original title	Notes
Taiga	1916	Тайга	Novella. Originally in Letopis magazine, 1916, Nos. 7-11
The Mob	1924	Ватага	Gosizdat (1925 on the sleeve)
Lake Peipus	1925	Пейпус-озеро	Novella. Nashi dni (Our Days) almanac, book 5, 1925. As a separate edition, 1930, Moscow, Nedra Publishers
Blizzard	1927	Пурга	Novella. Written In 1916, first published in 1927 by Novy Mir. Gave the Novosibgiz collection its title
The Wanderers	1931	Странники	Novel in three books. Book 1, "Filka and Amelka", published in Krasnaya Nov, 1930, issues 4-6. In full, as a separate edition came out in 1931 via Leningrad Writers' Publishers
Gloomy River	1933	Угрюм-река	Epic novel. Part 1, "Origins", was first published by Sibirskiye Ogni magazine, 1928, issues 3, 4. As a separate edition came out in 1933 via Writers' Publishers
The Crook	1944	Прохиндей	Novella Sovetsky Pisatel Publishers
Yemelyan Pugachev	1947	Емельян Пугачёв	Epic novel. Book 1, finished in 1938, came out in 1941, via Khudozhestvennaya Literatura . Books 2 and 3 were published by Gospolitizdat posthumously, in 1946 and 1947, respectively

== Short stories ==
Title	Year of publication	Original title	Notes
Cedar	1908	Кедр	Symbolic fairytale. Sibirskaya Zhizn. Dedicated to his gymnasium teacher Vyatkin
And So They Prayed	1912	Помолились	Zavety magazine, Moscow, February 1912 edition. Included into the Novosibgiz 1938 Blizzard collection
Cold Country	1912	Холодный край	Sibirskaya Zhizn, 4 November 1912, as "Na Severe" (Up North). Krasnaya Niva magazine, April 1923 issue, as "Cold Country"
Charms of Spring	1912	Чары весны	Zhizn Altaya, No. 102
Mother-in-Law	1912	Тёща	Zhizn Altaya, No. 212
A Man from the City	1912	Человек из города	Sibirskaya Zhizn
The Chapel	1912	Часовня	Originally titled Na bogomolye (On Pilgrimage)
The Pretty One	1913	Краля	Zavety, February 1913, originally as "Yevdokeya Ivanovna"
Vanka Khlyust	1914	Ванька Хлюст	Ezhemesyachny Zhurnal (Monthly Journal), October 1914. Included into the 1938 Blizzard collection
Magic Flower	1915	Колдовской цветок	Otechestvo magazine, August 1915
Borodulin, the Cavalry Reconnaissance Officer	1915	Конный разведчик Бородулин	Otechestvo magazine, August 1915
Hasty Trial	1916	Суд скорый	Written in Tomsk in 1914. First in the Sibirsky Skaz collection published by Ogni in Petrograd. Included into the 1938 Blizzard collection
Varya's Dream	1916	Варин сон	Severnуe Zori (Northern Dawn) collection
Convict	1916	Каторжник	Ezhemesyachny Zhurnal, No.1, 1917
Beaver Hat	1917	Бобровая шапка	Shipovnik almanac, book 26.
Dear Mister	1917	Дяденька	Shipovnik almanac, book 26.
Gold Means Grief	1917	Золотая беда	Shipovnik almanac, book 26.
The Other Side	1917	Та сторона	Severnoe Delo (Northern Cause) collection, Issie No.1. Included into the 1938 Blizzard collection
The Provocateur. A True Story	1918	Провокатор. Быль	Altayski Krestyanin (The Altai Peasant) magazine. Nos. 17-18
"Merican"	1919	Мериканец	The Footing of the Tower collection. Written in 1918
"For Pastures New"	1920	"На травку"	The Footing of the Tower collection. Written in 1918
Fearsome Kam	1923	Страшный кам	Moskovski Almanac. Written in 1919. Based on a real life story of the lynching of an Altai shaman, kam.
The Exams	1923	Экзамен	Drezina magazine, August issue
The Death of Tarelkin	1923	Смерть Тарелкина	Prozhektor magazine, December 1923 issue. Included into the 1935 collection Shuteinye Rasskazy (Funny Stories)
The Show in the Ogryzov Village	1923	Спектакль в селе Огрызово	Krasnaya Nov, May issue
Ivan Puzikov, the Sherlock Holmes	1923	Шерлок Холмс - Иван Пузиков	Krasnaya Niva, October issue
Khrenovinka	1923	Хреновинка (*)	Krasny Voron, No.36. Included into the 1928 Kikimora collection. (*) Khrenovinka, literally "weird little thing", refers to the telephone the hero is greatly impressed with
Old Woman	1924	Бабка	Originally in the Show in the Ogryzov Village collection. Later included into the 1935 edition of Funny Stories
Cranes	1924	Журавли	Krasny Zhurnal Dlya Vsekh, No.1, 1924
Fresh Breeze	1924	Свежий ветер	Molodaya Gvardiya, No.1, 1924
The Ring	1925	Кольцо	Krasnaya Nov, No.6
Divorce	1926	Развод	Originally in the Complete Works 1926 edition, vol.IX. Written in 1925.
"Nastyukha"	1926	"Настюха"	Originally in the Complete Works 1926 edition, vol.IX. Written in the same year. Later included into the 1935 edition of Funny Stories
Swimmers	1926	Пловцы	The Ring collection
Scarlet Snowdrifts	1926	Алые сугробы	Krasnaya Nov, No.10, 1926
The Taiga Wolf	1926	Таёжный волк	Novy Mir, No.11, under the original title "Baklanov"
The Beheading	1927	Усекновение	The Beady Mug (Бисерная рожа) collection
Dikolche	1927	Дикольче	
Greed	1931	Алчность	Blizzard, 1931 collection. Written in 1927
Chertoznai	1938	Чертознай	Literaturny Sovremenik magazine. Written in 1937 in Pushkin
We'll Sustain!	1942	Прокормим!	October magazine, February issue
Guest from Siberia	1942	Гость из Сибири	Krasnaya Zvezda newspaper, 1 November issue
Curious Occasion	1943	Любопытный случай	Krasnoarmeyets newspaper, Nos. 17-18
Generous sacrifice	1943	Щедрая жертва	Proud Family collection
The Susanins of the Soviet Land	1943	Сусанины советской земли	Proud Family collection
Long Live Life	1944	Да здравствует жизнь!	The Collected Works by V.Y. Shishkov, 1960-1962, vol 3
Tempest	1944	Буря	Krasnoarmeyets newspaper, No. 7

=== Plays ===
Title	Year of publication	Original title	Notes
Little Man	1920	Мужичок	Comedy
Whirlwind	1920	Вихрь	Drama
Unity	1920	Единение	One-act play
Smarties	1920	Грамотеи	
Precarious Existence	1920	На птичьем положении	
Breadwinners	1920	Кормильцы	One-act play
Bad Weed	1920	Дурная трава	Comedy
Old World	1921	Старый мир	Drama
Migraine	1921	Мигрень	One-act play
Two and Three	1921	Два и три	One-act play

== Non-fiction ==
- On the Biya River (На Бии, 1914)
- True Tales of Chuisk (Чуйские были, 1914). Ezhemesyachny Zhurnal (Monthly Journal), April issue. Collection of essays and sketches. Included into the 1938 Blizzard collection
- With a Scrip On (С котомкой), Krasnaya Nov, 1922, book 6; 1923, book 1. Set of traveller sketches
