= Demid Pyanda =

Russian explorer

Demid Sofonovich Pyanda (Демид Софонович Пянда) or, according to some sources, Panteley Demidovich Pyanda (Пантелей Демидович Пянда), also spelled Penda (Пенда) (? – after 1637) was among the first and most important Russian explorers of Siberia. According to few historical documents and later reconstructions based on them, Pyanda, in 1620–1623, while leading a party which was hunting for Siberian furs and buying them from the locals, became the first known Russian to ascend the Lower Tunguska River and reach the proximity of the Lena, one of the world's greatest rivers. According to later legendary accounts, collected a century after his journey, Pyanda allegedly discovered the Lena River, explored much of its length, and via the Angara River returned to the Yenisey, whence he came.

Thus, in three and a half years from 1620 to 1624 Pyanda explored some 1,430 miles (2,300 km) of the Lower Tunguska's length, and possibly some 1,500 miles (2,400 km) of the Lena and some 870 miles (1,400 km) of the Angara (the Lower Tunguska and Angara both are Yenisey's largest tributaries). In total, Pyanda may have discovered about 5,000 miles (8,000 km) of hitherto unknown large Siberian rivers. He may have discovered Yakutia and was possibly the first Russian to meet Yakuts as well as Buryats. He also proved that the Angara (a Buryat name) and Upper Tunguska (Verkhnyaya Tunguska, as initially known by Russians) are one and the same river.

== Name and identity ==
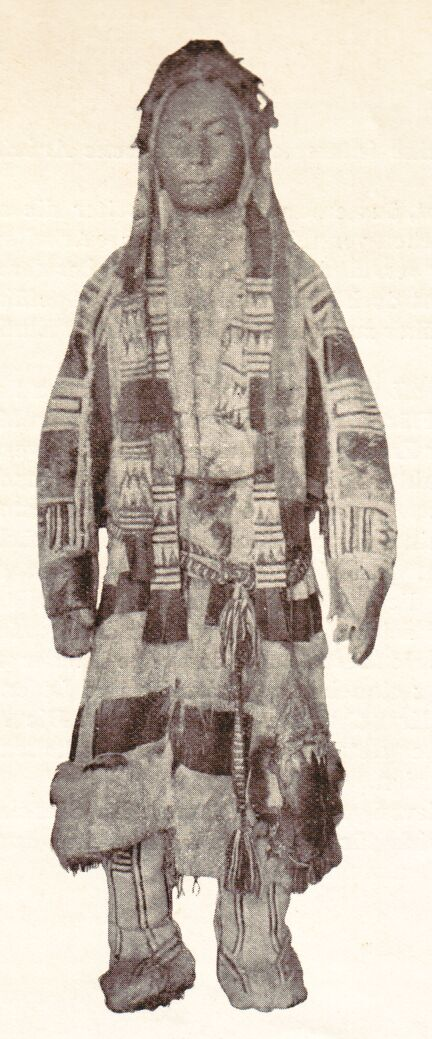
Samoyed in winter clothes

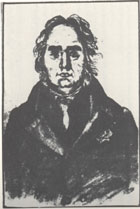
Gerhardt Friedrich Müller

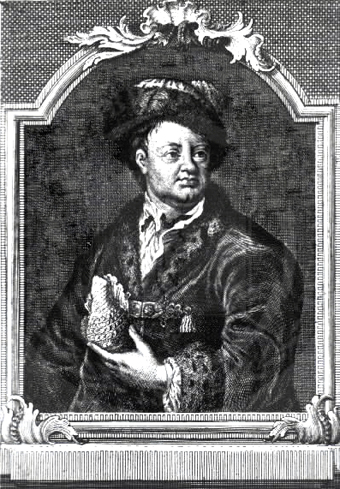
Johann Georg Gmelin

Pyanda was a nickname, meaning a fur brim of malitsa, which was a kind of Samoyedic clothes made from reindeer skin. Pyanda was made from dog fur of different colours and was added to malitsa for beauty.

In the first third of the 17th century there were two men in Yakutia with the nickname Pyanda. One was Pyanda Safonov (the son of Safon, or Sofon) named Demid – his name appeared in documents in 1637. The other was Panteley Demidovich Pyanda (probably a son of Pyanda Safonov) – his name was recorded in 1643. The great explorer most likely was named Demid Sofonovich Pyanda.

Only a few original documents on Pyanda exist, and his deeds are mostly known by the records collected some 100 years later, in the 18th century, especially during the Great Northern Expedition, launched by the Russian government to establish the Arctic and Pacific coastline of Russia and find a way to the Americas. At the same time, the so-called Academic Squad of that expedition pioneered the research of the Siberian nature and history.

The German-born historian Gerhardt Friedrich Müller found a document in the Siberian archives, proving that the winter settlement Pyandino on the upper part of the Lower Tunguska already existed in 1624, which meant that it had been established at least a year before.

The legend of Pyanda and his journey on the Lena and Angara was recorded by naturalist Johann Georg Gmelin (another German in the Russian service), while he was travelling in the regions of the Yenisey and Lena. Müller also recorded some legends about Pyanda in Siberia.

On the basis of the Cossack hearsay stories, the document about Pyandino and a few mentions of Pyanda's name in other documents academician Alexey Okladnikov reconstructed Pyanda's alleged journey, as it is presented in the sections below.

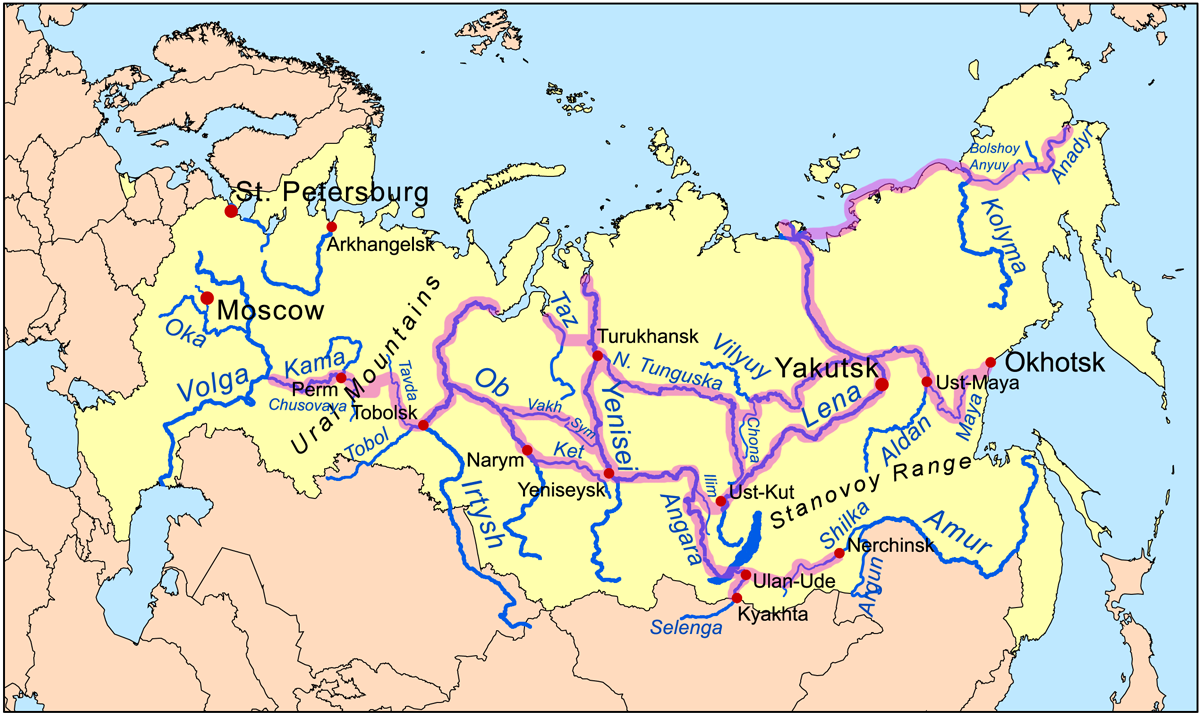
Siberian river routes. Pyanda's route was from Turukhansk upstream the N. Tunguska to the Lena River, then downstream Lena to the location of future Yakutsk, then back upstream and via the Angara River back to the Yenisei.

== Ascent of the Yenisey and Lower Tunguska ==
Demid Sofonovich Pyanda came to prominence in Mangazeya around 1619, coming there from the Yeniseysky ostrog. He had some money and riches of unknown origin. Taking about 40 men with him, he went to Turukhansk on the Yenisey near the mouth of the Lower Tunguska (or Nizhnyaya Tunguska in Russian). While buying furs from the locals there, he heard stories about a large river to the east of the Lower Tunguska, called Elyu-ene, which in Evenk language means "large river". Russians, in their own manner, rendered it to Lena (a shorter form of the Russian feminine name Yelena, corresponding to Helen).

According to some notes made by Englishmen in Pustozersk in 1611–1612, Siberian Cossacks knew about the existence of Lena already in 1611–1612. Many wanted to find this yet legendary Lena River and its plentiful fur riches, however at the same time another kind of story appeared, telling of a great river to the east, where large ships with bells and cannons were sailing. This may have referred to Chinese ships on the Amur River, not the Lena, but the Russians were still unaware that there were two different major rivers east of Yenisey. The tales of armed ships made the Russian adventurers more careful and slow in their movement eastward.

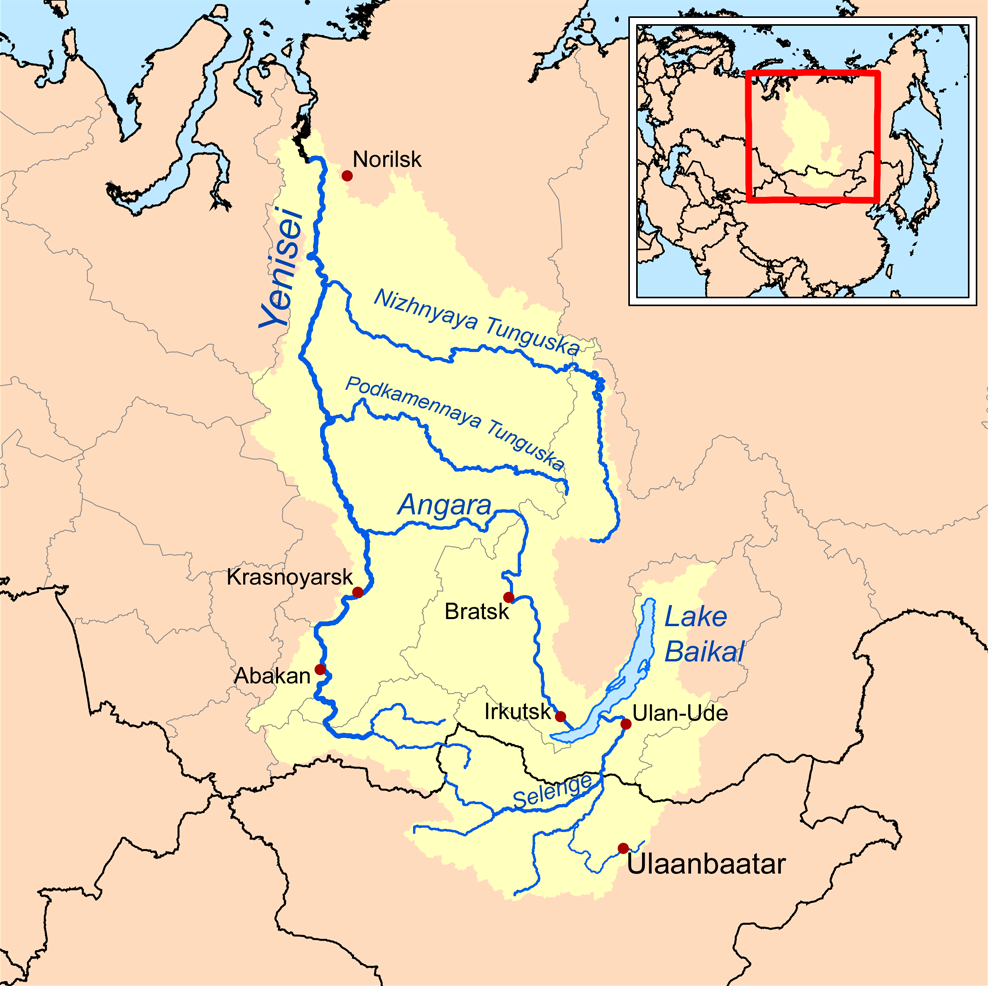
Yenisey watershed

Pyanda happened to be the most resolute of the potential explorers, and in 1620 he became the leader of a very protracted expedition. He sailed from Turukhansk up the Lower Tunguska with many men on several strug boats. They moved rather quickly amid the taiga-covered banks of the river, until the river's course turned south and the valley narrowed. Tree trunks, floating down the river, impeded the way – Pyanda thought the Tunguses were trying to force him to turn around. Wanting either to avoid excessive risks or to buy furs from the locals right at the point they had already reached, Pyanda ordered his men to stop and build a winter settlement, later called Nizhneye Pyandino (Lower Pyandino). It was in the region where the Lower Tunguska is close to Vilyuy, a major tributary of the Lena. Tunguses indeed soon made several attacks, however the Russians easily repelled them with firearms.

The next year, 1621, Pyanda sailed only several dozen kilometers up the river, and at 62°N he built Verkhneye Pyandino (Upper Pyandino), another winter settlement. In 1623 he sailed south several hundred kilometers more and yet again stayed at the winter settlement, at 58°N. Such slow pace of his journey is explained either by the resistance of Tunguses or by successful fur trade with them.

== Discovery and exploration of the Lena ==
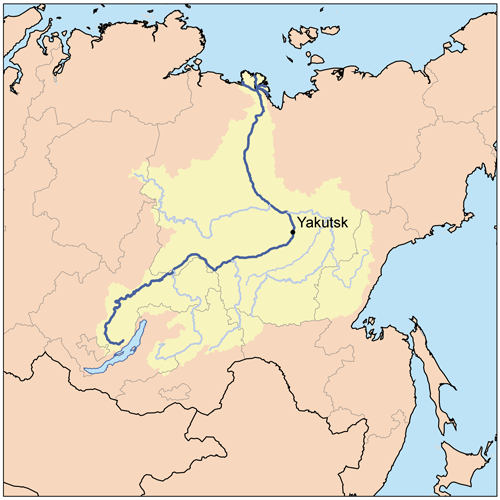
Lena River watershed

The latter winter settlement of Pyanda's party happened to be very close to the so-called Chechuysky volok, a 12-mile (19 km) portage between the Tunguska and the upper Lena. Finally, in 1623, Pyanda either carried his strugs to the Lena or built new boats where he was, soon reaching this great river of Eastern Siberia.

After the ice on Lena had cracked and floated down the river, Pyanda followed it and for several days sailed through rocky banks. After passing the mouth of the right tributary called the Vitim, the Lena became wider and soon turned east, flowing amid the low banks and numerous islands. After passing the mouth of another southern tributary, the Olyokma, the banks again became rocky. Pyanda reached the lands inhabited by the Yakuts and turned back, avoiding a wintering amid the yet unknown race of people.

== Exploration of the Angara ==
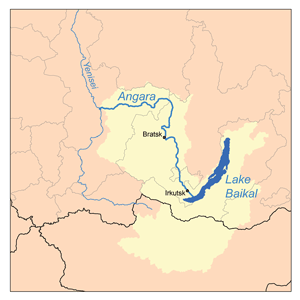
Angara watershed

Pyanda returned to Chechuysky volok and decided to explore another way back to Yenisey. He sailed up Lena until it became too rocky and shallow, and then journeyed westward through the steppes inhabited by nomadic Buryats.

In autumn of 1623 Pyanda's party reached the upper Angara and still had some time to build new boats, since Angara usually freezes rather late. Pyanda and his men successfully passed the Angara rapids and finally reached the mouth of the river at Yenisey, having discovered that the Angara is the same river as the Upper Tunguska (Verkhnyaya Tunguska), as it was previously named by Yeniseyan Cossacks. In the late 1623 or in early 1624 Pyanda reached Yeniseysk where his 5,000 miles (8,000 km) long journey ended.

Later Pyanda's name was once mentioned in the Cossack documents, however his further life is unknown.

== Pyanda's priority in the Lena discovery ==
Raymond Henry Fisher wrote in his 1943 work (before the 1949 publication of Okladnikov), that the Lena had been reached in 1620 by men from Mangazeya, who descended the Vilyuy River to its confluence with the Lena. This corresponds to the first year of Pyanda's journey as reconstructed by Alexey Okladnikov, but there is no conclusive evidence that Pyanda or his men reached Lena that early, while the existence of the Pyandino settlement near the confluence of the Lower Tunguska and Lena suggests that Pyanda more likely discovered Lena that way.

While many sources name Pyanda or Penda as the first known explorer of Lena, others start the account of Lena's exploration from Vasily Bugor's name. Bugor was not the first Russian on the Lena, but his journey was the first well attested one, and the very first via the Angara and Kirenga Rivers. Between Pyanda's journey in 1620-24 and Bugor's voyage in 1628–30, attempts to reach the Lena were made by several other explorers. Grigory Semyonov sought the Lena in 1625 (one of his men, Matvey Parfyonov is thought to have reached the river); Bazhen Kokoulin traveled to the Lena in 1626 and Martemyan Vasilyev in 1627–28. All of them descended to the Lena via its tributary the Vilyuy, unlike Pyanda or Bugor. Since 1632, when Yakutsk was established in the central Yakutia by Pyotr Beketov, the presence of Russians in the Lena region became continuous.

== Sources ==
- И.П. Магидович, В.И. Магидович Очерки по истории географических открытий. Издание в 5 томах. Том 2, стр. 268–271. Москва, "Просвещение", 1983 // I.P. Magidovich, V.I. Magidovich. Notes on the History of Geographical Discoveries in 5 volumes. Vol.2, pp. 268–271. Moscow, Prosvescheniye, 1983. (in Russian)
- Окладников А.П. Пенда - забытый русский земплепроходец XVII века. - В сб.: Летопись Севера. М., Изд-во Главсевморпути, 1949, т. 1. // Okladnikov A. P. Penda - the forgotten Russian explorer of the 17th century. A part of: Northern Chronicle. Moscow, the publishing house of the Chief Directorate of the Northern Sea Route, 1949, vol. 1. (in Russian)
