= Mirnoye, Krasnoyarsk Krai =

Mirnoye Мирное
- Hamlet
- Interactive map of Mirnoye
- Location of Mirnoye Mirnoye (Krasnoyarsk Krai)
- Coordinates: 62°18′N 89°1′E
- Country: Russia
- Federal subject: Krasnoyarsk Krai
- Administrative district: Turukhansky District

Population (2010 Census)
  - Total: 0
  - Estimate (2010): 0 )

Municipal status
  - Municipal district: Turukhansky Municipal District
- Time zone: UTC+7 (MSK+4)
- Postal code: 663245
- OKTMO ID: 04654701957

Mirnoye (Russian: Ми́рное) is a rural locality (a hamlet) in Turukhansky District in Krasnoyarsk Krai, Russia. This small human settlement is a part of Turukhansky Municipal District. Mirnoye is located approximately 20 kilometres (12 mi) to the south of Bakhta village, located also on the right bank of the Yenisei River.

This place, whose name means 'peaceful' in the Russian language, is mentioned in the literary works of Russian writer Mikhail Tarkovsky and in the novel The Woman Who Waited by Andreï Makine.

== Arctic research station ==
The Yenisei Ecological Station, an Arctic research station, is located in the area of Mirnoye.

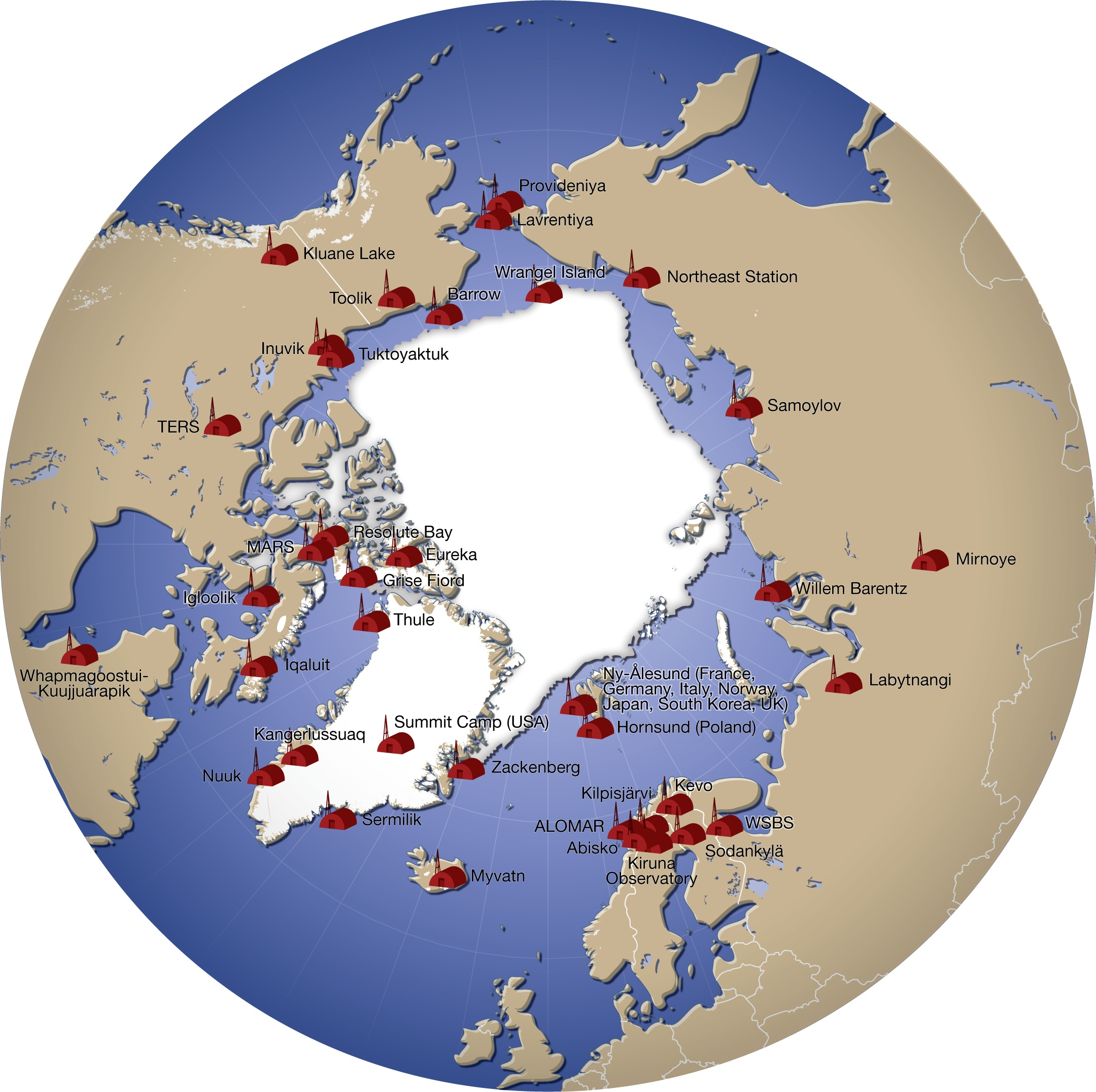
Location of the major research stations in the Arctic

== See also ==
- List of research stations in the Arctic
