= Nepa (river) =

Location
- Country: Russia

Physical characteristics
- Source
  - coordinates: 57°55′11″N 105°03′03″E
- Mouth: Nizhnyaya Tunguska
  - coordinates: 59.2577°N 108.2037°E
- Length: 683 km (424 mi)
- Basin size: 19,100 km^{2} (7,400 sq mi)

Basin features
- Progression: Nizhnyaya Tunguska→ Yenisey→ Kara Sea

The Nepa (Russian: Непа) is a river in Irkutsk Oblast, Russia. It is a left tributary of the Nizhnyaya Tunguska. It is 683 kilometres (424 mi) long, and has a drainage basin of 19,100 square kilometres (7,400 sq mi).
