= Tunguska Plateau =

Landform in Central Siberia

- Тунгусское плато
- Location within Krasnoyarsk Krai

Highest point
- Peak: Unnamed
- Elevation: 866 m (2,841 ft)

Dimensions
- Length: 600 km (370 mi)
- Width: 300 km (190 mi)

Geography
- Country: Russia
- Federal subject: Krasnoyarsk Krai
- Range coordinates: 65°0′N 92°0′E
- Parent range: Central Siberian Plateau
- Borders on: Yenisei Range

Geology
- Rock age: Paleozoic
- Rock types: Sedimentary rock, Trap rock and tuff intrusions

Climbing
- Easiest route: From Turukhansk

The Tunguska Plateau (Russian: Тунгусское плато, romanized: Tungusskoye plato) is a mountain plateau in Krasnoyarsk Krai, Siberia, Russia. It is a part of the Central Siberian Plateau. The plateau is located in a largely uninhabited area. This area (the village of Noginsk) was abandoned in 2006.

The Tunguska Plateau is named after the historical name of the Evenks.

== Geography ==
The Tunguska Plateau is located in central Krasnoyarsk Krai. To the north it is limited by the Kureika River and to the south by the Stony Tunguska River. To the north and northeast rise the Putorana Mountains and to the east the border with the Syverma Plateau is not clearly defined. To the west the Tunguska Plateau descends quite abruptly towards the Yenisei River valley and to the southeast rises the Angara Range. The largest river having its sources in the plateau is the Bakhta, a right tributary of the Yenisei. Other rivers flowing from it are: Erachimo, Nimde, Kochumdek, Tutonchana, Degali and Uchami (tributaries of the Lower Tunguska); and Stolbovaya and Kondroma (right tributaries of the Stony Tunguska).

The average height of the Tunguska Plateau surface is between 600 meters (2,000 ft) and 800 meters (2,600 ft). The slopes of the mountains are often stepped and river valleys tend to form deep canyons in some areas. The Lower Tunguska River crosses the plateau and divides it roughly into two halves. The highest point is a 962 metres (3,156 ft) high unnamed summit in the southern half of the northern part.

== Geology ==
Geologically the Tunguska Plateau is made up of Paleozoic sedimentary rocks with volcanic rock intrusions —mainly trap rock and tuff.

== Flora and climate ==
The plateau is part of the East Siberian taiga ecoregion. It is entirely covered by somewhat sparse and undersized larch taiga, except on the highest summits where only mountain tundra grows. There are swamps in the river valleys. The Tunguska Plateau is located in the permafrost zone and the soil never thaws at great depths.

The climate prevailing in the Tunguska Plateau is subarctic continental.
