= Gloomy River =

1933 novel by Vyacheslav Shishkov

- Author: Vyacheslav Shishkov
- Original title: Угрюм-река
- Language: Russian
- Publisher: Khudozhestvennaya Literatura
- Publication date: 1933
- Publication place: Soviet Union
- Media type: Print (Paperback & Hardback)
- Preceded by: The Wanderers

Gloomy River (Russian: Угрюм-река, romanized: Ugryum-reka) is a 1933 socrealist epic novel by Vyacheslav Shishkov, telling the story of one Siberian family, deeply involved in the Siberian gold rush.

== Publications and translations ==
Part one of the novel, "Istoki" (Russian: Истоки, Origins) first appeared in 1928 in the Sibirskiye Ogni (Siberian Lights) magazine, issues 3 and 4. The fragment of Part 6 was published by Krasnaya Nov in 1932 (Nos. 9 and 10). The whole novel (which took Shishkov twelve years to write) came out as a separate edition in 1933 via Khudozhestvennaya Literatura.

It has been translated into German (as Der dunkle Strom), Czech (as Řeka života), Polish (as Rzeka posępna) and Hungarian (as Zord-folyó). It was translated into English by Irina Henderson (nee Mochalova). She died before completing the translation and it was completed by Emily Justice. The book was privately published in 2006 by Harry Henderson, Irina Henderson's husband.

== Background ==
In 1891 Shishkov graduated from the Vyshnevolotsk technical college and, after a three-year practice joined the Tomsk regional transport ministry. There he met Nikolai Yefimovich Matyunin, an heir to the rich Yenisei-based merchant family who told him a lot about the history of gold-mining in this region. The prototypes for the Gromov family (grandfather, father and son, respectively) became Kosma, Averyan and Nikolai Matonins. Ugryum-reka is a fictional river, but in many ways and details it bears resemblance to Nizhnyaya Tunguska.

== Synopsis ==
It is the mid-19th century Siberia, and Danila Gromov on his deathbed reveals to his son Pyotr the whereabouts of the huge wealth he had hidden in the forest, which he had collected in the old times, when being a member of the gang of criminals. Pyotr, even if dogged by huge personal issues, including heavy drinking and mental issues (which eventually drive him into the institution), manages to build a prosperous business on this money, but even more successful proves to be his son Prokhor, a talented and purposeful young man, who creates an industrial empire all through Siberia which brings him great wealth, power and influence.

But it seems the evil that Danila Gromov had done, haunts his grandson. Initially, an honest man, Prokhor, through the sequence of catastrophes (including the mysterious death of his lover Anfisa, whom his father also fancies) descends into the mire of vice, betrayal, emotional turmoil and, finally madness which leads him to suicide.

== Analysis ==
According to Shishkov himself, "The major theme of the novel… is the Capital, with all of its specific stenches and vices. It grows into itself, as well as in every possible way outwards, develops and gains strength, and then, after having reached its limits, it crumbles down, its spurious solidity being challenged by the growing self-consciousness of the workers... Lawlessness, violence, barbarity, merciless exploitation of the labour, all of this is being cursed in the novel, which could be seen as a requiem for the capital, for the whole repressive system of old. The Gloomy River has locked upon itself, and now there is the sunset breaking through the darkness of the old world, there are new voices of the future battles and victories from where the River of Joy flows," he wrote in Literaturny Leningrad, on 7 November 1933.

== Critical reception and legacy ==
The book received very positive reviews at the time it was published. It has been described as "a vast tapestry", "a huge integral picture, investigating the genesis of the Russian gold mining industry, its inner contradictions and the birth of the vast working movement." "Once you've read The Gloomy River, it stays with you forever," wrote B. R. Tomashevsky in Literaturnaya Gazeta.

"Anyone who'd like to take a deep look into the history of Siberia, won't be able to do without Shishkov," Konstantin Fedin wrote in 1945. On 28 March 1950, speaking at the meeting commemorating Shishkov's legacy, Fedin remarked: "The Gloomy River is part of the great Russian classic literature. Such books are the pride of our literary heritage."

Shishkov considered the novel to be his lifetime achievement, and once called it 'great forfeit'. "This thing, in terms of density, the concentration of real life and human suffering it deals with, is the main book of my life, and could be the one reason was born at all," he wrote in his 5 April 1933 letter to his brother A.Y. Shishkov.

=== Adaptations ===
In 1968 Yaropolk Lapshin shot a four-part film for the Sverdlovsk Film Studio, starring Georgy Epifantsev as Prokhor Gromov and Lyudmila Chursina as Anfisa.

In 2021, a television series with the same name was premiered on Channel One Russia, directed by Yuri Moroz.
