= Central Siberia Nature Reserve =

Nature reserve in Krasnoyarsk Krai, Russia

- Russian: Центрально-Сибирский заповедник (Also: Tsentralnosibirsky)
- IUCN category Ia (strict nature reserve)
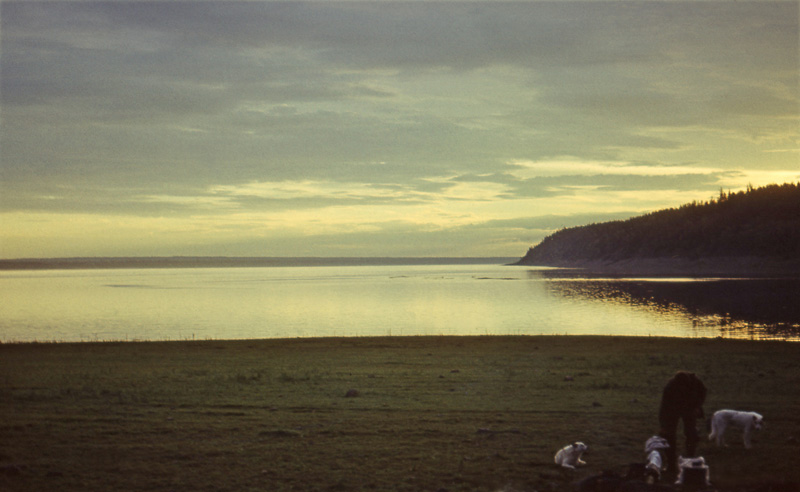
- Bakhta waterfront, Tsentralnosibirsky Reserve

- Location within Russia
- Location: Krasnoyarsk Krai
- Nearest city: Bor
- Coordinates: 62°21′25″N 90°39′51″E
- Area: 1,021,469 hectares (2,524,105 acres; 3,944 sq mi)
- Established: 1985
- Governing body: Ministry of Natural Resources and Environment (Russia)
- Website: http://centralsib.com/

Central Siberia Nature Reserve (Russian: Центрально-Сибирский заповедник) (also Tsentralnosibirsky) is a Russian 'zapovednik' (strict nature reserve). With over 1 million hectares of protected area, it is one of the largest forest reserves in the world. The reserve is located in the middle Yenisei, lower Bakhta and lower Stony Tunguska river valleys, of the Central Siberian Plateau. Notably, the territory covers both banks of the Yenisei for over 60 km. The reserve is situated in the Turukhansky District of Krasnoyarsk Krai.

== Topography ==
The Central Siberia Reserve has a terrain that is mostly taiga (about 80% of the territory) and Yenisei floodplain meadows and wetlands (20%). It is located towards the northern edge of the taiga belt, and on the low hills of the west of the plateau. The reserve covers both sides of the Yenisei, and runs parallel to the Stony Tunguska river to the south.

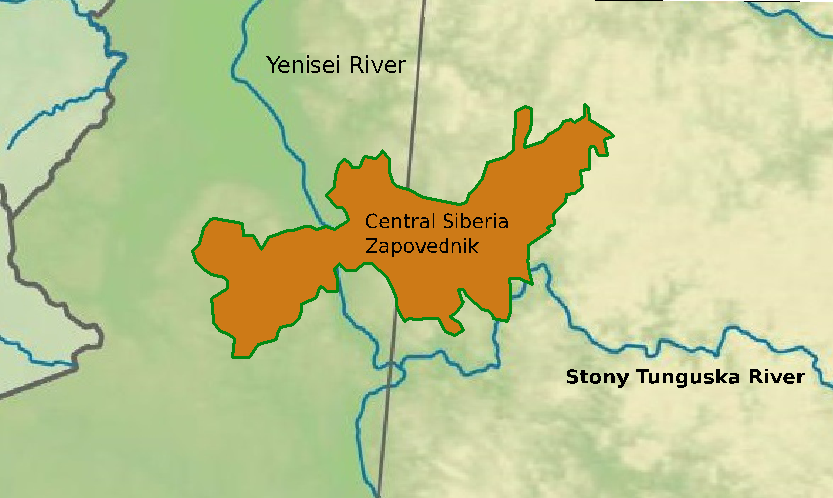
Borders of the Nature Reserve

== Climate and ecoregion ==
Central Siberia is located in the East Siberian taiga ecoregion, a vast region between the Yenisei River and Lena River. Its northern border reaches the Arctic Circle, and its southern border reaches 52°N latitude. The dominant vegetation is light coniferous taiga with Larix gmelini forming the canopy in areas with low snow cover. This ecoregion is rich in minerals.

The climate of the Central Siberia Reserve is Subarctic climate, without dry season (Köppen climate classification Subarctic climate (Dfc)). This climate is characterized by mild summers (only 1–3 months above 10 °C (50.0 °F)) and cold, snowy winters (coldest month below −3 °C (26.6 °F)).

== Flora and fauna ==
The plant life of the reserve has aspects of both boreal and arctic floral communities, and are representative of the low hills of the Central Siberian Plateau dominated by taiga forests. Typical trees are the Siberian pine (Pinus sibirica). At the latitude of the Central Siberian Reserve (60 degrees North), the Siberian pine grows at 100–200 meters in altitude; farther south into Mongolia it is a mountain tree growing at 1,000-2,000 meters. There are stands of larch and other pine in the reserve. There are also lesser numbers of Siberian spruce (Picea obovata), mixed in stands with fir and cedar. Common understory bushes are blueberries, cranberries, and rhododendrum, with oxtails and sedges. The river valleys support extensive wetland meadows with reed-grass and forb plant communities and aquatic plants of the shallow oxbow lakes. Scientists on the reserve have recorded over 500 species of vascular plants.

The reserve is known for large concentrations of elk along the Yenisei during winter. Overall, the terrestrial animal life of the reserve is that of the north central boreal forest: sable, reindeer, etc. The Yenisei is a flyway for migratory birds, and the reserve supports bird-watching excursions.

== Ecoeducation and access ==
As a strict nature reserve, the Central Siberia Reserve is mostly closed to the general public, although scientists and those with 'environmental education' purposes can make arrangements with park management for visits. There are four 'ecotourist' routes in the reserve, however, that are open to the public, but require permits to be obtained in advance. Two of these routes are rafting trips on streams of the reserve, one is to river-side rock formations, and one is for birdwatchers. The main office is in the village of Bor ("Forest"), just to the south on the Yenisei.

== See also ==
- Yeloguy River § Protected area
- List of Russian Nature Reserves (class 1a 'zapovedniks')
