= Bakhta (river) =

River in Krasnoyarsk Krai, Russia

Bakhta Бахта
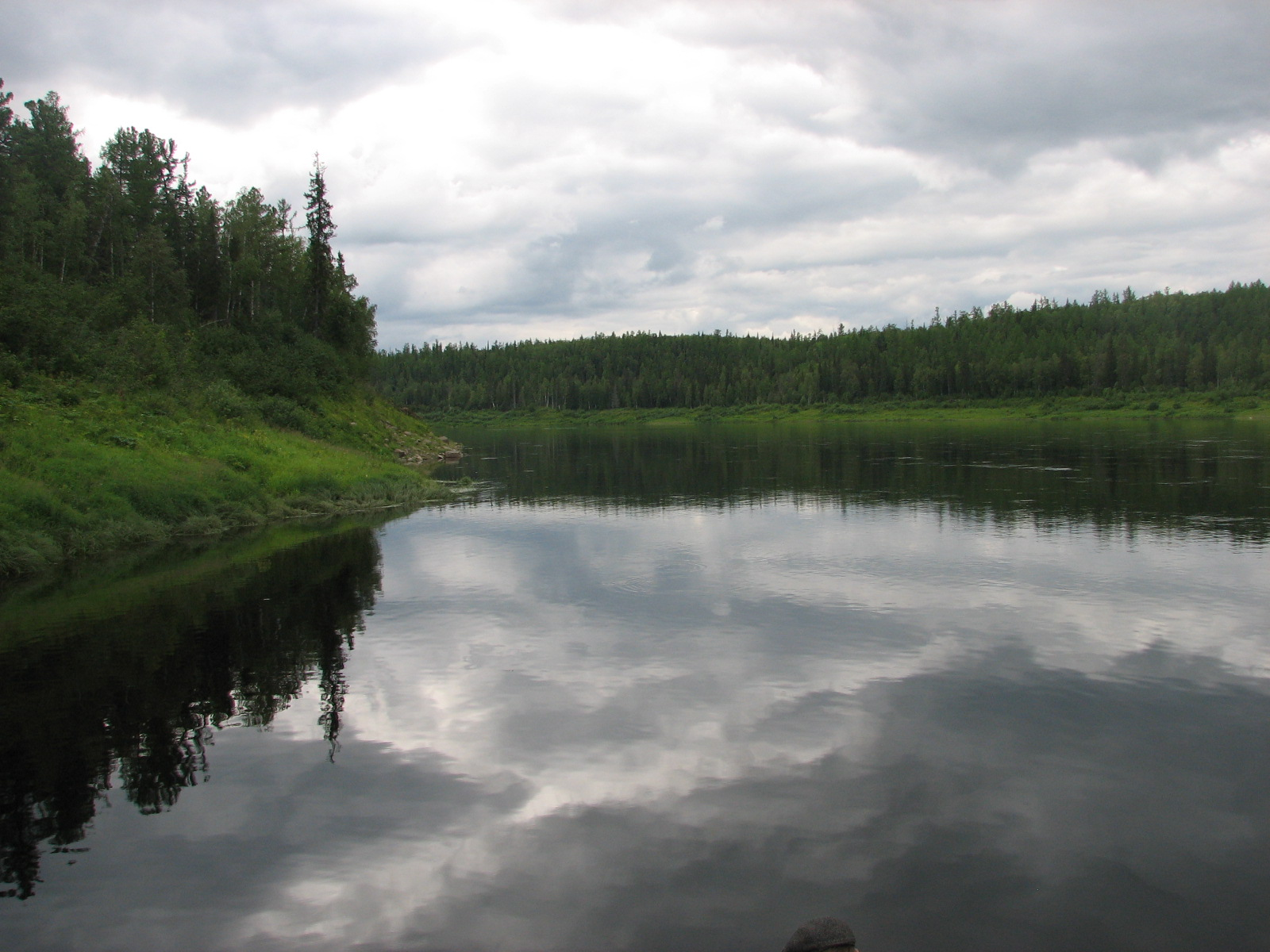
- View of the river in July

- Mouth location in Krasnoyarsk Krai, Russia

Location
- Country: Evenky District, Krasnoyarsk Krai, Russia

Physical characteristics
- Source
  - location: Tunguska Plateau
  - coordinates: 62°55′54″N 93°26′31″E
  - elevation: 630 m (2,070 ft)
- Mouth: Yenisey
  - coordinates: 62°27′55″N 89°0′1″E
  - elevation: 19 m (62 ft)
- Length: 498 km (309 mi)
- Basin size: 35,500 km^{2} (13,700 sq mi)

Basin features
- Progression: Yenisey→ Kara Sea

The Bakhta (Russian: Бахта) is a river in Krasnoyarsk Krai, Russia. It is a right hand tributary of the Yenisey.

The Bakhta is 498 kilometres (309 mi) long, and the area of its basin is 35,500 square kilometres (13,700 mi^{2}). The lower reaches of the river are navigable.

== Course ==
The Bakhta has its source in the Tunguska Plateau, part of the western side of the Central Siberian Plateau. It begins flowing northwestwards, then it bends about midway through its course and flows roughly southwestwards.

The Bakhta flows in a remote mountainous area through a narrow valley surrounded by taiga until it leaves the plateau area and flows across the Yenisei plain. The Bakhta joins the right bank of the Yenisey at Bakhta village. The confluence is located roughly halfway between the mouths of the Podkamennaya Tunguska and Nizhnyaya Tunguska. The river freezes in mid-October and stays frozen until mid-May.

A section of the lower course of the river, including its confluence with the Yenisei are located in the Central Siberia Nature Reserve.

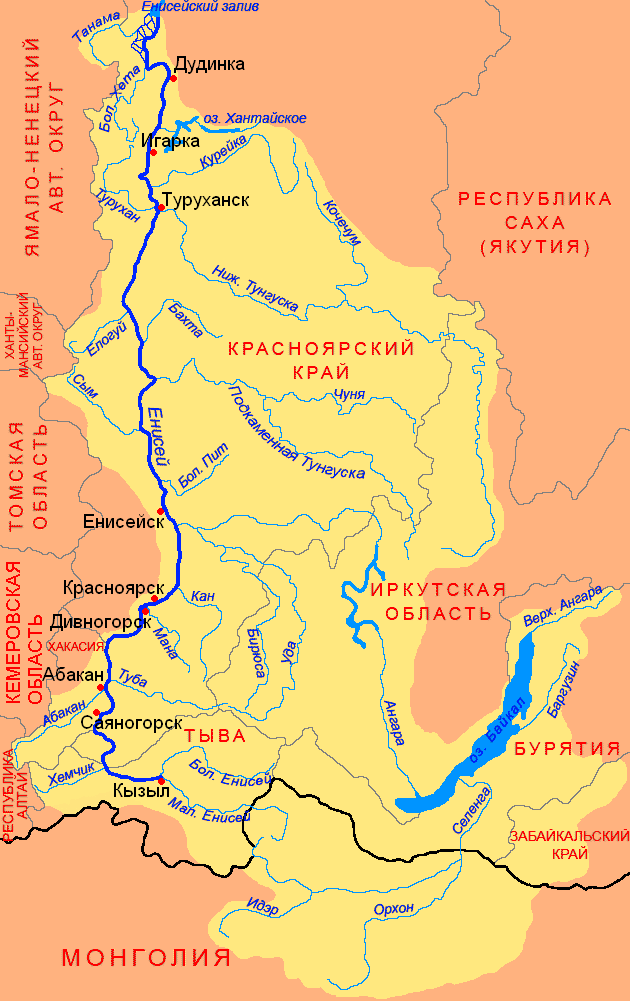
Basin of the Yenisei

== See also ==
- List of rivers of Russia
