= Noginsk, Krasnoyarsk Krai =

Noginsk Ногинск
- Abandoned village
- Location within Krasnoyarsk Krai
- Coordinates: 64°29′0″N 91°14′20″E
- Country: Russia
- Federal subject: Krasnoyarsk Krai
- District: Evenkiysky District

Noginsk was a settlement in the Tunguska Plateau, in the western Evenkiyskiy District, Krasnoyarsk Krai. The village was a port on the Nizhnyaya Tunguska River.

== History ==
The village was founded by Mikhail Sidorov in 1859 under the name of the Olga-Vasilievsky Mine, named in honour of the wife and friend of Sidorov. A graphite mine was opened in Noginsk in the same year and was supplied to pencil factories in St Petersburg and other cities.

During the Soviet era, the settlement developed thanks to the extraction of graphite, and helped to encourage the settlement and development of the Russian Far North. A village council was formed on 20 March 1950 and Noginsk was proclaimed as a working village on 16 March 1951.

Noginsk had the third largest deposit of coal and graphite in the Soviet Union, amounting to around 9 million tons; however, due to the cost of extracting it, operations at the mine ceased shortly after the collapse of the USSR when the extraction company closed.

== Elimination of the settlement ==
The population of the village, which had grown to more than 700 people during the Soviet era, quickly fell nearly as low as 100 after the closure of the graphite mine. As a result, a referendum was held in 2006 on the elimination of Noginsk. The majority of the residents voted in favour of its liquidation. By the end of 2006, the 52 families in the village had moved to other towns and cities in Krasnoyarsk Krai and elsewhere in Siberia, and Noginsk became a ghost town.
