= Ilimpeya =

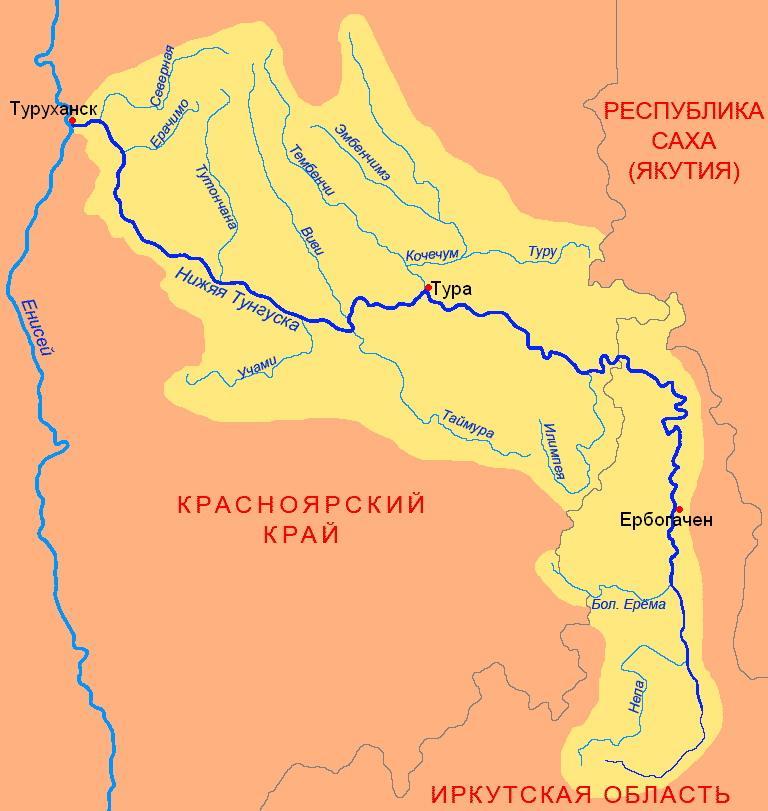
- Map of the Nizhnyaya Tunguska river that shows the Ilimpeya river

Location
- Country: Russia

Physical characteristics
- Mouth: Nizhnyaya Tunguska
  - coordinates: 63.3392°N 105.5825°E
- Length: 611 km (380 mi)
- Basin size: 17,400 km^{2} (6,700 sq mi)

Basin features
- Progression: Nizhnyaya Tunguska→ Yenisey→ Kara Sea

The Ilimpeya (Russian: Илимпея) is a river in Krasnoyarsk Krai, Russia. It is a left tributary of the Nizhnyaya Tunguska. It is 611 kilometres (380 mi) long, and has a drainage basin of 17,400 square kilometres (6,700 sq mi).
