= Bakhta, Turukhansky District, Krasnoyarsk Krai =

Bakhta Бахта
- Village
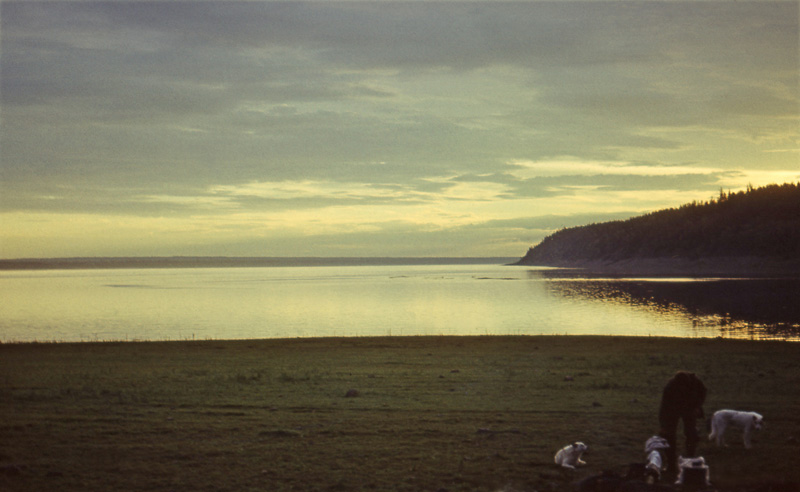
- Bakhta waterfront
- Interactive map of Bakhta
- Location of Bakhta Bakhta (Krasnoyarsk Krai)
- Coordinates: 62°27′52″N 89°0′8″E
- Country: Russia
- Federal subject: Krasnoyarsk Krai
- Administrative district: Turukhansky District
- Founded: 1745 as "Bakhtinsky"

Population (2010 Census)
  - Total: 220
  - Estimate (2010): 220 (0%)

Municipal status
  - Municipal district: Turukhansky Municipal District
- Time zone: UTC+7 (MSK+4)
- Postal code: 663245
- OKTMO ID: 04654701912

Bakhta (Russian: Бахта) is a rural locality (a village) in Turukhansky District, Krasnoyarsk Krai, Russia. It is part of Turukhansky Municipal District.

The village is located in the right bank of the Yenisei, by its confluence with the Bakhta River. There is a pier for boats reaching the village. Bakhta houses the Museum of Taiga Traditions. Mirnoye hamlet is located approximately 20 kilometres (12 mi) to the south of Bakhta, also on the same bank of the Yenisei.

The 2010 movie Happy People: A Year in the Taiga by Werner Herzog focuses on the life of the people in the village of Bakhta.

== Protected area ==
The Central Siberia Nature Reserve, a protected area of the East Siberian taiga ecoregion, is located in Bakhta.

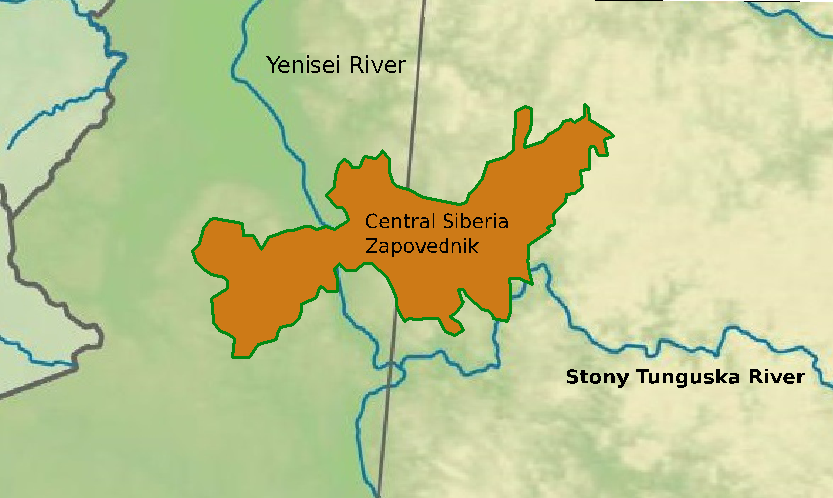
Map of the Central Siberia Nature Reserve

== See also ==
- Tunguska Plateau, located east of the village
