= Taymura =

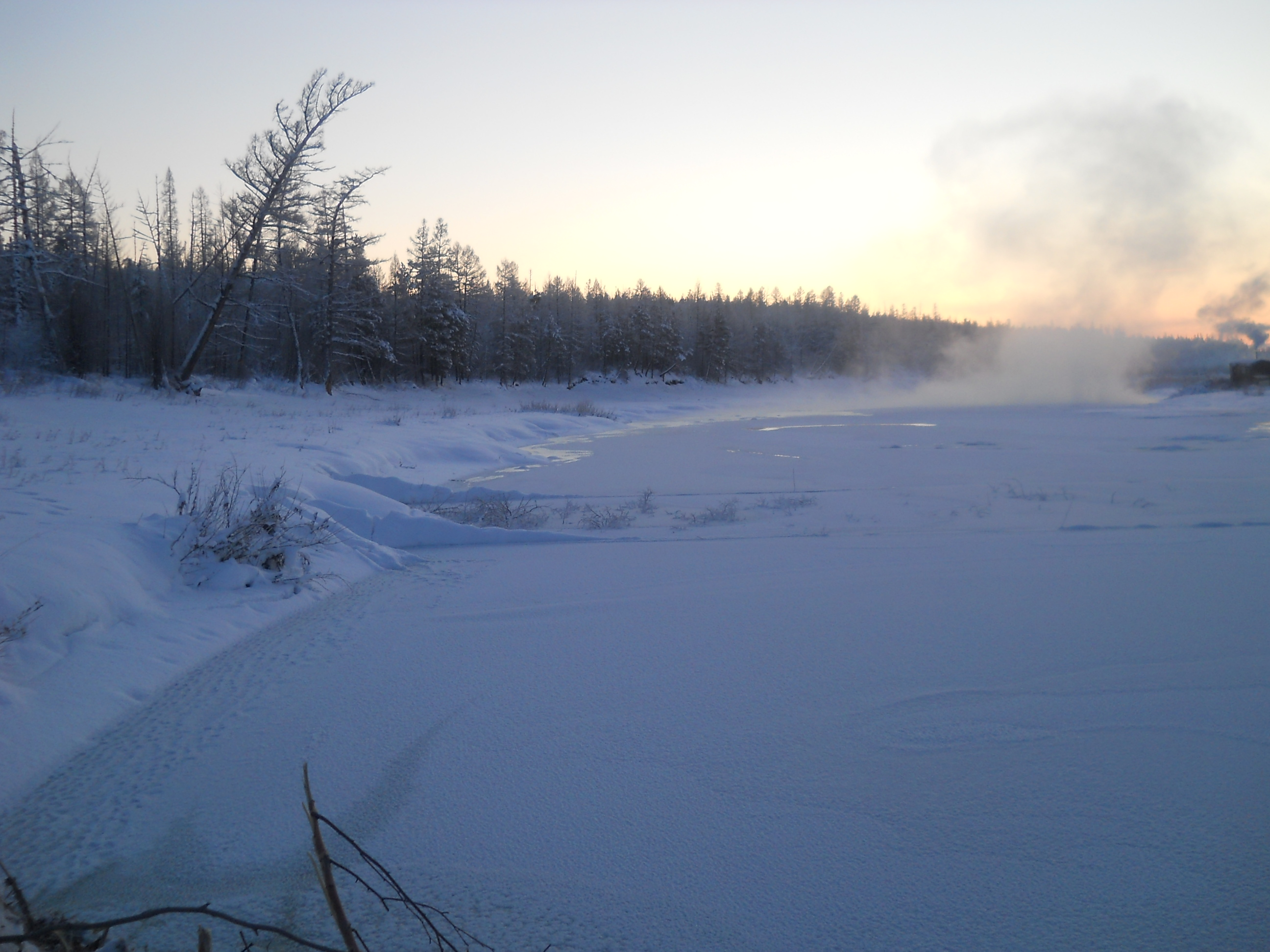

Location
- Country: Russia

Physical characteristics
- Mouth: Nizhnyaya Tunguska
  - coordinates: 63°45′44″N 98°04′22″E
- Length: 661 km (411 mi)
- Basin size: 32,500 km^{2} (12,500 sq mi)

Basin features
- Progression: Nizhnyaya Tunguska→ Yenisey→ Kara Sea

The Taymura (Russian: Тайму́ра) is a river that runs to the west of Central Siberia in Evenkiysky District, Krasnoyarsk Krai, Russia. It is a left tributary of the Nizhnyaya Tunguska. It is 661 kilometres (411 mi) long (454 km excluding the upper course upstream from the Yuzhnaya Taymura), and has a drainage basin of 32,500 square kilometres (12,500 sq mi).

The source of the river is the confluence of the Severnaya (North) Taymura and Yuzhnaya (South) Taymura. It flows in a wide valley across the Central Siberian Plateau. The river freezes in October and flows under the ice until May. Snow and rain feed the river. The average annual water consumption at 332 km (206 mi) from the mouth is 87.6 cubic metres per second (3,090 cu ft/s). There are more than 800 lakes in the river basin; their total area is 17.1 km^{2} (6.6 mi^{2}).

The largest tributaries are the following rivers: Charveya, Unary, Delingdeken, Kerboku, Dyelingdeken, Detkekte, Siki, Neptenne and Varheme.

Kerbo, the only village on the river, has been uninhabited since Soviet times.
