= Kot Bakhta =

Coordinates: 31°44′N 75°12′E

- Village
- Interactive map of Kot Bakhta
- Country: India
- State: Punjab
- District: Gurdaspur
- Tehsil: Batala
- Region: Majha

Government
  - Type: Panchayat raj
  - Body: Gram panchayat

Area
  - Total: 52 ha (130 acres)

Population (2011)
  - Total: 468; 245/223 ♂/♀
  - Scheduled Castes: 97; 56/41 ♂/♀
  - Total Households: 101

Languages
  - Official: Punjabi
- Time zone: UTC+5:30 (IST)
- Telephone: 01871
- ISO 3166 code: IN-PB
- Vehicle registration: PB-18
- Website: gurdaspur.nic.in

Kot Bakhta is a village in Batala in Gurdaspur district of Punjab State, India. It is located 11 kilometres (6.8 mi) from sub district headquarter, 41 kilometres (25 mi) from district headquarter and 11 kilometres (6.8 mi) from Sri Hargobindpur. The village is administrated by Sarpanch an elected representative of the village.

== Demography ==
As of 2011, the village has a total number of 101 houses and a population of 468 of which 245 are males while 223 are females. According to the report published by Census India in 2011, out of the total population of the village 97 people are from Schedule Caste and the village does not have any Schedule Tribe population so far.

== See also ==
- List of villages in India
