= Bhakt (pejorative) =

Pejorative term for supporters of the BJP in India

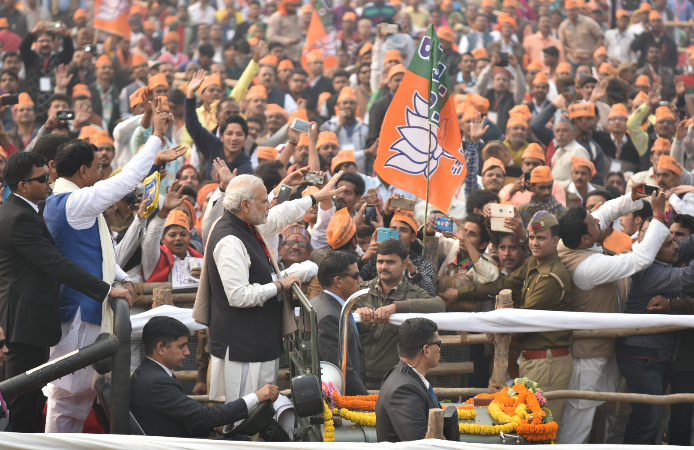
Prime Minister Narendra Modi greets supporters in Varanasi

Bhakt (भक्त) in the modern Indian political context is a pejorative term often referring to ardent supporters of Indian Prime Minister Narendra Modi or the BJP, particularly those who resort to deification and therefore sometimes uncritical in their support. While not all Modi supporters are bhakts in this sense, the term has come to describe a specific mindset or behavioral pattern that favours either a theocratic or demagogic form of rule and therefore unwilling or unable to engage in rational discourse. The term is used in a derogatory manner when referring to BJP supporters or other right-wing populists.

== Origin ==
In 2014, journalist Rajdeep Sardesai used the term in his post, "Super speech by Modi; not so super behaviour by some bhakts. Guess some things won't change" hours after he was heckled at New York's Madison Square Garden by supporters after criticizing Modi. In a 2015 interview, Sardesai then went further "You cannot be an objective observer any more; either you are a bhakt or you are a permanent critic".

The connection between BR Ambedkar's historic use of the word 'bhakti' as a shrill political warning, and the contemporary term bhakt referring to followers of a political ideology has not been established in academic writing, but many journalists have alluded to that connection. Ambedkar had said...

"For in India, Bhakti or what may be called the path of devotion or hero-worship, plays a part in its politics unequalled in magnitude by the part it plays in the politics of any other country in the world. Bhakti in religion may be a road to the salvation of the soul. But in politics, Bhakti or hero-worship is a sure road to degradation and to eventual dictatorship".

== Usage ==
Some supporters embrace the label themselves, using bhakt as a badge of devotion, loyalty and admiration for Modi's leadership, policies, Hindu values and vision for India.

However, the term has been widely applied by writers, critics, journalists and opponents to refer to Modi's devoted supporters, primarily when responding sarcastically or pejoratively to a wide range of Modi's statements and actions.

Nisha Mathew in her article Bhakt nation: The return of the Hindu diaspora in Modi's India describes this alternate and contradictory usage. "Used by critics, civil society groups, and dissenting popular cultural voices, 'Modi-bhakt' has evoked proactive rather than defensive responses from those that see themselves as fitting the description. Identifying as true patriots or 'desh bhakts' they have willingly embraced this evocative term coined by those they denounce as anti-national or enemies of the nation and nominated themselves as privileged individuals called to Modi's divine mission."

For critics, the word has become a convenient slur to stereotype Modi supporters who will frequently sidestep factual information and refuse to engage in meaningful debate. Opposition members such as Mahua Moitra frequently take jibes at the "Bhakt and troll army" of the Bharatiya Janata Party (BJP) in political discourse.

== The bhakt as sign of weakening democracy ==
Prominent author, activist and journalist Aakar Patel argues that the irrational nature of a bhakt's arguments are detrimental primarily because it is faith-based: "Devotion is not a product of the intellect but that of passion. It is religious, and like in religion the bhakt here is also not concerned with the material world, and what happens in reality."

Historian Ramachandra Guha has stated that bhakts essentially oppose the very concept of democracy and yet fail to recognise this hypocrisy: "Hero-worship is not uncommon in India. Indeed, we tend to excessively venerate high achievers in many fields. Millions of devotees on social media (as well as quite a few journalists) have succumbed to the most extreme form of hero-worship. More worryingly, one senior cabinet minister has called Narendra Modi a Messiah. A chief minister has insinuated that anyone who criticises the Prime Minister's policies is anti-national."

Guha adds that "at a nation-wide level the cult of Narendra Modi has had only one predecessor — that of Indira Gandhi".

To his bhakts, celebrating Modi as divine incarnation also entailed battering the public image of those running against him in elections or questioning his policies.

Prime Minister Narendra Modi is often criticised for cultivating a personality cult. Numerous leaders and supporters of Modi's political party Bharatiya Janata Party (BJP) have fed this god-like persona. Shivraj Singh Chouhan, the chief minister of Madhya Pradesh, said in 2022, "He is superhuman and has traces of god in him." A Maharashtra BJP spokesperson described Prime Minister Narendra Modi as the "11th incarnation" of Lord Vishnu, a remark that drew ridicule by the opposition. Modi's guru-like demeanour became apparent very early to a lot of his supporters. "Importantly, the picturesque imagery of Modi visiting a number of Hindu religious sights further bolsters his saintly demeanor besides brandishing his deep-rooted Hindu credentials."

Prime Minister Narendra Modi has himself often leaned into this self-deification and played to the apotheosis narrative in 2024 when he remarked that "Until my mother was alive, I had believed that perhaps my birth was a biological one, But after her death, when I look at my life experiences, I'm convinced that God has sent me here."

== The bhakt and their relationship with secularism ==
While religion is now an integral part of Indian politics, India's Constitution has since independence in 1947 remained mostly secular in principle.

Shashi Tharoor refers to Ambedkar's warning directly when discussing Narendra Modi. "Ambedkar warned against "bhakti" or worship in politics, but we have a personality cult around the prime minister, encouraged by the ruling party, which makes him a larger-than-life figure. We admittedly had a similar deification around Indira Gandhi 50 years ago. And this is not what Ambedkar would have wanted."

== See also ==
- Politics of India
- Godi Media
- Anti-national (India)
- Hindu Nationalism
- Rashtriya Swayamsevak Sangh
- Saffronisation
- Hindutva
- Sangh Parivar
- BJP IT Cell
- Amit Malviya
- Public image of Narendra Modi
