= Nizhnyaya Tunguska =

Nizhnyaya Tunguska Lower Tunguska
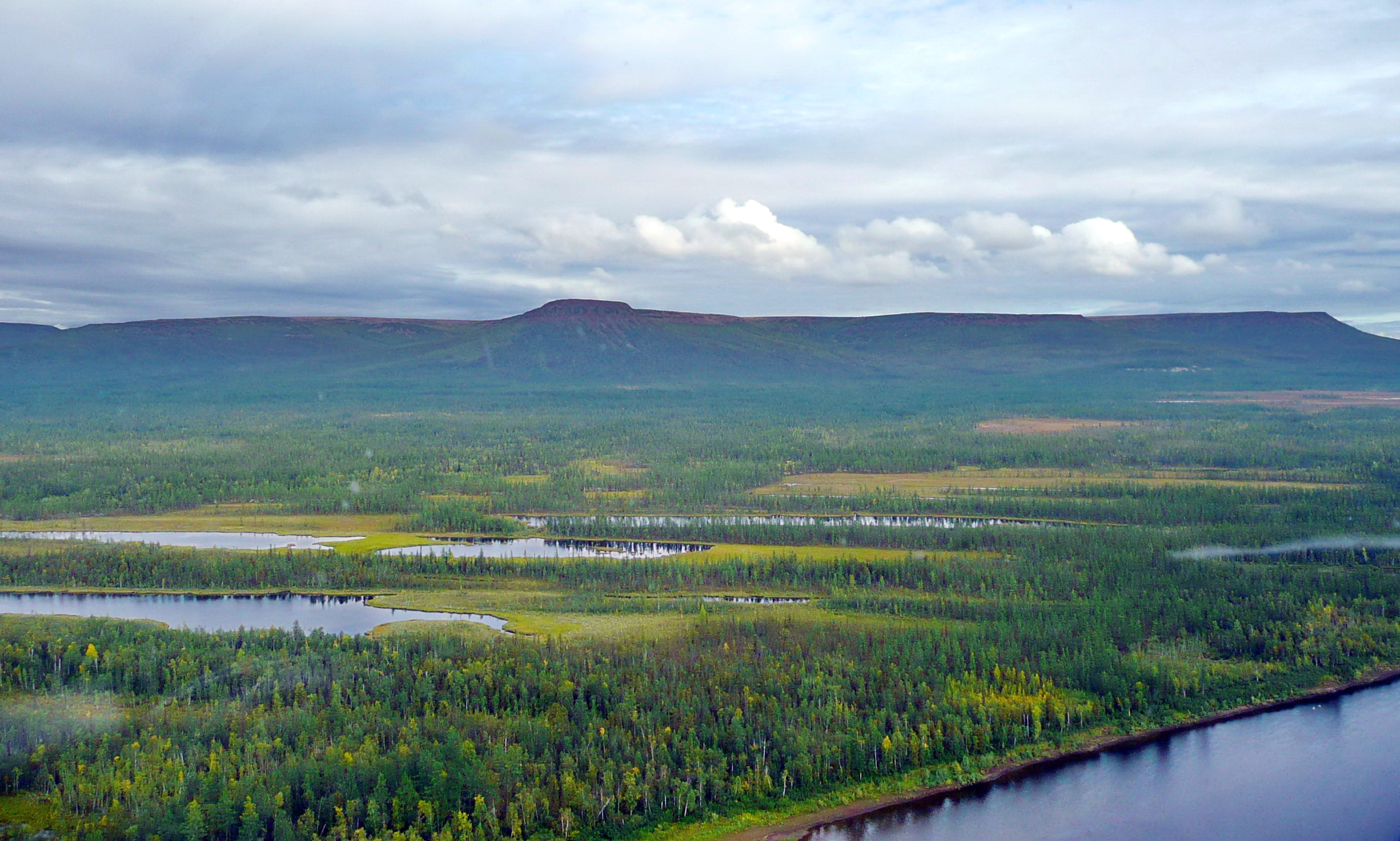
- The Lower Tunguska crosses the Tunguska and Syverma plateaus.

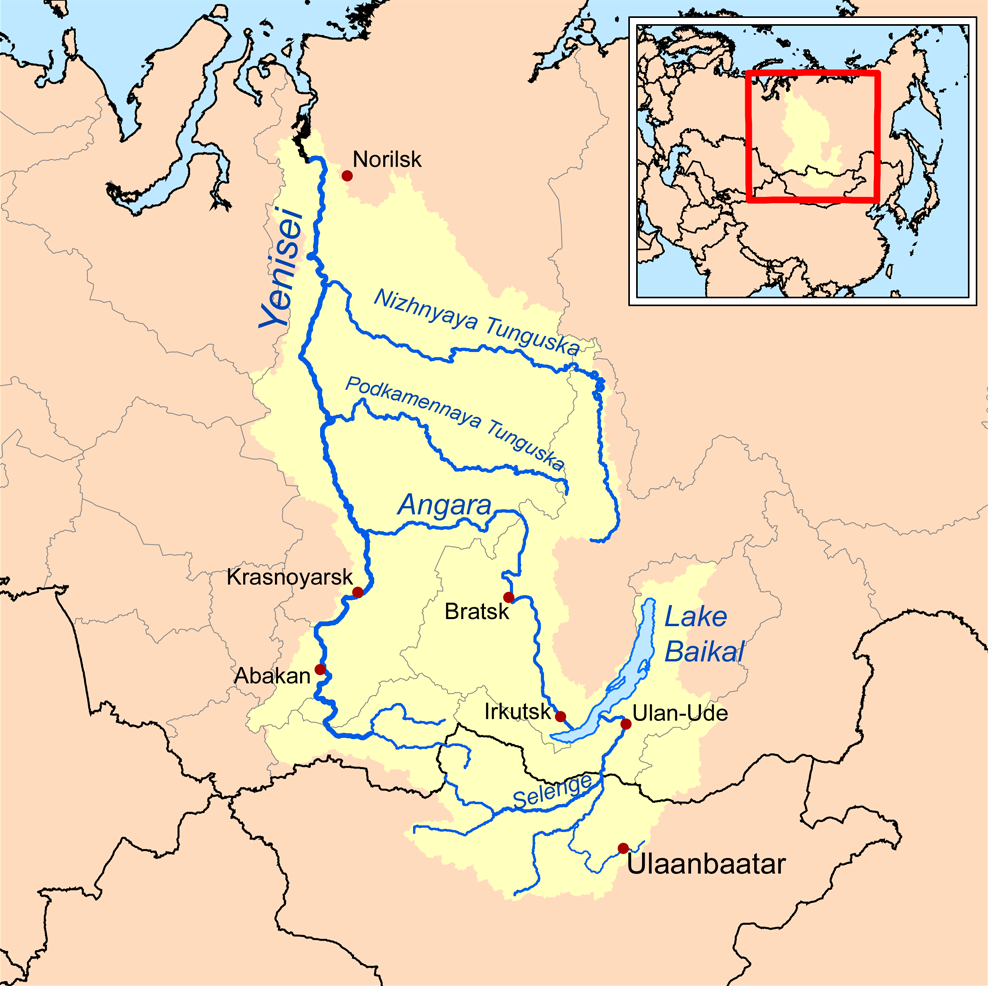
- Map of the Yenisey basin that shows the Nizhnyaya Tunguska river
- Native name: Нижняя Тунгуска (Russian)

Location
- Country: Russia
- Federal subject: Krasnoyarsk Krai, Irkutsk Oblast
- Cities: Turukhansk, Tura, Erbogachen

Physical characteristics
- Source: Angara Range, Central Siberian Plateau
  - location: Ust-Kutsky District, Irkutsk Oblast
  - coordinates: 58°01′52″N 105°42′07″E
  - elevation: 521 m (1,709 ft)
- Mouth: Yenisey
  - location: Turukhansk, Turukhansky District
  - coordinates: 65°46′16″N 87°57′07″E
  - elevation: 1 m (3.3 ft)
- Length: 2,989 km (1,857 mi)
- Basin size: 473,000 km^{2} (183,000 sq mi)
- Discharge
  - location: mouth
  - average: 3,680 m^{3}/s (130,000 cu ft/s)
  - minimum: 1 m^{3}/s (35 cu ft/s)
  - maximum: 112,000 m^{3}/s (4,000,000 cu ft/s)

Basin features
- Progression: Yenisey→ Kara Sea
- Tributaries
  - right: Kochechum

The Nizhnyaya Tunguska (Russian: Ни́жняя Тунгу́ска, IPA: [ˈnʲiʐnʲɪjə tʊnˈɡuskə], meaning 'Lower Tunguska') is a river in Siberia, Russia, that flows through the Irkutsk Oblast and the Krasnoyarsk Krai. The river is a right tributary of the Yenisey joining it at Turukhansk (see Siberian River Routes). The ice-free period on the Nizhnyaya Tunguska starts in mid-June and ends in the first half of October. The river forms the western limit of the Lena Plateau.

== Hydrography ==
The Nizhnyaya Tunguska is the second largest right tributary of the Yenisey, and joins it near the town of Turukhansk. It is 2,989 kilometres (1,857 mi) long, and has a drainage basin of 473,000 square kilometres (183,000 sq mi). According to the character of the stream, constitution of the river's valley and its shores, it can be divided into two parts: the first one starts at the source of the river and continues down to the village Preobrazhenka (formerly Preobrazhenskoye) and the second section of the river lies downstream of this village in a canyon-like relief.

=== Upper stream ===
The upper part of Nizhnyaya Tunguska is 580 kilometres (360 mi) long and follows a wide valley with flat slopes that was formed by sand and clay deposits. The speed of flow at rafts reaches 0.4 to 0.6 metres per second (1.3 to 2.0 ft/s) and drops significantly as the river's channel stretches.

This section of river has a meandering channel that closely approaches the Lena, another great Siberian river. The minimum distance between them is as short as 15 kilometres (9 mi) in the neighbourhood of Kirensk town. All of the upper course of Nizhnyaya Tunguska is within the Irkutsk Oblast.

=== Lower stream ===
Downstream of Preobrazhenskoye village Nizhnyaya Tunguska flows across the Tunguska Plateau of the Central Siberian Plateau in a narrow and deep valley with high, often rocky shores. The entire landscape here has volcanic origins, the relief alters the flow of Lower Tunguska into a westerly direction. The river channel frequently has lake-like widenings with lengths up to 20 kilometres (12 mi) and longer. The locations with close approaches of crystalline layers create numerous rapids on the river. The most significant of them have names such as: "Sakko", "Vivinsky", "Uchamsky" and "Bolshoy" (Russian: Большой, Big). The rapids on the river has relatively high speeds of water flux reaching 3 to 5 metres per second (10 to 16 ft/s). In some places downstream of the rapids the river channel becomes very deep with maximum depths of 60 to 100 metres (200 to 330 ft). In the river's lowest flow, downstream of join with its tributary river Severnaya, Nizhnyaya Tunguska runs between limestone rocks, which steeply rise from the water. The speeds of flow here grow to 1 to 1.5 metres per second (3 to 5 ft/s).

The channel and water flow of the river's lower stream has its own distinguishing features, which can be seen in some places at Lower Tunguska, including the following:

- The strips of stones with sizes 10 to 40 centimetres (4 to 16 in), which stretch near water along the shore line. This peculiar feature of Arctic stony rivers with the local name bechevnik, from the Russian name for "towpath", is formed during every period of ice drift and river inundation at spring. At some locations these sorts of pebbles are polished and pressed together to the extent that they create a cobbled road of their own kind.
- The slopes of the river canyon during its evolution underwent stone avalanches that formed stone runs of individual rocks as big as 1.5 metres (4.9 ft) in diameter. These slide-slopes have a local name, korga (корга), and create zones of calm backwater downstream.
- The stream in the channel of the Nizhnyaya Tunguska sometimes forms whirlpools. They originate downstream of cliffs which channels flow to the opposite shore. These whirlpools can reach depths to 100 metres (330 ft) and occur most often during high-water periods in early summer.

=== Tributaries ===
The most significant tributaries of Nizhnyaya Tunguska are the rivers entering from the right: Yeyka, Kochechum, Yambukan, Vivi, Tutonchana, Erachimo, and Severnaya. Entering from the left are the Nepa, Bolshaya Yeryoma, Teteya, Ilimpeya, Nidym, Taymura, and Uchami. The most prominent tributary is Kochechum, which joins the main stem from the north near Tura. The average annual discharge of the Kochechum is 600 cubic metres per second (21,000 cu ft/s), and its basin covers nearly 100,000 square kilometres (39,000 mi^{2}).

On the whole, the right tributaries of Nizhnyaya Tunguska dominate over the left and add more water. The river has no big lakes in its basin; the biggest is Vivi with a surface area of 229 square kilometres (88 mi^{2}). Inflows to the Nizhnyaya Tunguska are strongly seasonal.

== Hydrology ==
The value of average water discharge of Nizhnyaya Tunguska gives it eleventh place amongst largest rivers of Russia. The annual water discharge at the river's mouth is equal to 3,680 cubic metres per second (130,000 cu ft/s). The minimum value observed in 1967 was 2,861 cubic metres per second (101,000 cu ft/s); the maximum was 4,690 cubic metres per second (166,000 cu ft/s) in 1974 or, respectively, for the estuary of the river it was about 3,093 cubic metres per second (109,200 cu ft/s) and about 5,070 cubic metres per second (179,000 cu ft/s). The water supply of the river is from melting snow and summer rains. During winter season Nizhnyaya Tunguska contains little water as its basin lies in the region of permafrost and it has no subterranean water sources. According hydrological observations during 52 years, the minimum average monthly discharge was 27.8 cubic metres per second (980 cu ft/s) in March 1969—it was exceptionally dry winter—and the maximum value corresponds to June 1959 and was 31,500 cubic metres per second (1,110,000 cu ft/s) The diagram below contains mean values of monthly average discharges calculated on the base of a 52-year-long period of observations at hydrological station "Bolshoy Porog" (фактория Большой Порог, Bolshoy Porog factory).

Seventy-three per cent of the entire annual water yield occurs during the spring–summer season. The amplitude of the water-level variations in the lower stream of Nizhnyaya Tunguska is the highest among all notable rivers of Russia. At narrow places in the river channel, ice jams during its seasonal drift, and this creates temporary dams that block normal water flow and raise water levels up to 30 to 35 metres (98 to 115 ft) above the mean value. The summer break-up and drifting of ice passes very violently; it leaves traces in the form of torn-apart uprooted trees and polished rocks. During some days of spring freshets the river's discharge can peak at 74,000 to 112,000 cubic metres per second (2,600,000 to 4,000,000 cu ft/s), and it supplies 50 to 60 per cent of the water volume to the lower stream of the Yenisey in the time of its seasonal inundation.

== Settlements ==
From the mouth up.

- Turukhansk
- Noginsk, Krasnoyarsk Krai (depopulated in 2006)
- Tutonchany
- Uchami
- Nidym
- Tura
- Kislokan
- Yukta
- Inarigda
- Nakanno
- Khamakar
- Simenga (Сименга), not directly on the river
- Yerbogachen
- Oskino, Irkutsk Oblast
- Yerema
- Moga
- Preobrazhenka, Katangsky District
- Yuryeva
- Kalinina
- Nepskoye municipality
  - Nepa
- Gazhenka (Гаженка), depopulated
- Sosnino (Соснино)
- Podvoloshino, Irkutsk Oblast
- ru:Верхнекарелина, depopulated

== Economy ==
The channel of Nizhnyaya Tunguska with its tributaries constitutes dense network of rivers and creeks which creates convenient summer pathways through the wide rifted valley of Eastern Siberia. Historically, the river was used as a route for the fur trade, fishery, for transportation of goods and mineral resources. Hunting and fur trade is still a significant part of the local economy.

=== Shipping ===
Navigation on the river is difficult because of a number of rifts, rapids and whirlpools. The passage of large ships and barges is possible during the spring inundation, and rainy weather during particular years allows short periods of navigation at the end of summer or the start of autumn. The most problematic for the safe navigation of ships are the rapids "Bolshoy", which are 128 to 130 kilometres (80 to 81 mi) from the river's mouth. In 1927 the first steamship passed this rapids and it is considered to be the start of modern navigation on the river from Turukhansk to Tura. As of 2010 the shipping routes of Yenisey River Steamship Lines (Russian: Енисейское речное пароходство) includes the village Kislokan, 1,155 kilometres (718 mi) from the estuary. Timber rafting is possible throughout entire course of the river.

It was suggested (and some research was done) in 1911 to build a canal joining the Lena and Nizhnyaya Tunguska rivers in the neighbourhood of Kirensk. Near this locality the rivers are separated by no more than 15 kilometres (9 mi), but here the Nizhnyaya Tunguska is not navigable and flows at an elevation of 329.7 metres (1,082 ft) above sea level, whereas the Lena flows at an elevation of 245.3 metres (805 ft). In the beginning of 20th century the canal project was considered inexpedient due to its complexity and high cost.

=== Planned damming ===
Plans to dam the river existed since the early Soviet period. These plans were the subject of criticism by various ecologists. Construction of the dams also became impossible after disintegration of Soviet Union due to economic reasons. In 2005–10 the interest to this project and the discussion of it revived to some extent. According news media the construction of the Turukhanskaya hydroelectric powerplant would begin as soon as in 2010. Since the precise date is unknown, a more likely start-up is between 2010 and 2020.

After completion of this project Nizhnyaya Tunguska will be dammed, flooding about 10,000 square kilometres (3,900 mi^{2}) of forest and tundra (roughly the size of Lebanon or the islands of Hawaii), some of which contains buried nuclear waste, and displacing the indigenous Evenk population. The cost of the plant is estimated at $13 billion dollars, which includes costs of electric power lines. The plant will be built and operated by RusHydro in the Krasnoyarsk region, and the electricity will be channeled to European Russia via a 3,500-kilometre (2,200 mi) system of power lines.

== Notable facts ==
- The colonisation history of Western Siberia by Russians since 17th and 18th centuries was reflected in various names for the river at different times. At some periods it was called Troitskaya Tunguska (Russian: Троицкая Тунгуска), Monastyrskaya Tunguska (Russian: Монастырская Тунгуске) and Mangaseyan Tunguska (Russian: Мангазейская Тунгуска, see Mangaseya).
- In literature, the river Nizhnyaya Tunguska is described in the novel Gloomy River by Vyacheslav Shishkov. This writer of the first half of the 20th century visited the river during an expedition in 1911; the name "Gloomy River" was taken from a Siberian song.
- Existing sources indicate that the annual average discharge of water at mouth of its tributary Severnaya is equal to 300 cubic metres per second (11,000 cu ft/s). As this river joins Nizhnyaya Tunguska downstream of hydrological station "Bolshoy Porog" it means that the known average discharge at mouth of Nizhnyaya Tunguska is significantly underestimated. It must be in the range of 3,700 to 3,900 cubic metres per second (130,000 to 140,000 cu ft/s).
