= Talwandi Bakhta =

- Village
- Country: India
- State: Punjab
- District: Gurdaspur
- Tehsil: Batala
- Region: Majha

Government
  - Type: Panchayat raj
  - Body: Gram panchayat

Area
  - Total: 299 ha (740 acres)

Population (2011)
  - Total: 744; 407/337 ♂/♀
  - Scheduled Castes: 31; 16/15 ♂/♀
  - Total Households: 128

Languages
  - Official: Punjabi
- Time zone: UTC+5:30 (IST)
- Telephone: 01871
- ISO 3166 code: IN-PB
- Vehicle registration: PB-18
- Website: gurdaspur.nic.in

Talwandi Bakhta is a village in Batala in Gurdaspur district of Punjab State, India. It is located 6 kilometres (3.7 mi) from sub district headquarter, 33 kilometres (21 mi) from district headquarter and 6 kilometres (3.7 mi) from Sri Hargobindpur. The village is administrated by Sarpanch an elected representative of the village.

== Demography ==
As of 2011, the village has a total number of 128 houses and a population of 744 of which 407 are males while 337 are females. According to the report published by Census India in 2011, out of the total population of the village 31 people are from Schedule Caste and the village does not have any Schedule Tribe population so far.

== See also ==
- List of villages in India
