= Bhakti =

Devotional love, a concept in Indian religions

Bhakti (Sanskrit: भक्ति; Pali: bhatti) is a concept common in Indian religions which means attachment, fondness for, devotion to, trust, homage, worship, piety, faith, or love. In Indian religions, it may refer to loving devotion for a personal God (like Krishna or Devi), a formless ultimate reality (like Nirguna Brahman or the Sikh God) or an enlightened being (like a Buddha, a bodhisattva, or a guru). Bhakti is often a deeply emotional devotion based on a relationship between a devotee and the object of devotion. A devotee is a bhakta or bhakt.

One of the earliest appearances of the concept is found in the early Buddhist Theragatha (Verses of the Elders) through the term bhatti. Early texts such as the Shvetashvatara Upanishad and the Bhagavad Gita, describe bhakti as contemplating God as a form of yoga.

Bhakti ideas have inspired many popular texts and saint-poets in India. The Bhagavata Purana, for example, is a Krishna-related text associated with the Bhakti movement in Hinduism. Bhakti is also found in other religions practiced in India, and it has influenced interactions between Christianity and Hinduism in the modern era. Nirguni bhakti (devotion to the divine without attributes) is found in Sikhism, as well as Hinduism. Outside India, emotional devotion is found in some Southeast Asian and East Asian Buddhist traditions.

The bhakti movement, pioneered by the Tamil Alvars and Nayanars, developed around the Hindu gods Vishnu (Vaishnavism), Shiva (Shaivism) and Devi (Shaktism) in the second half of the 1st millennium CE.

== Terminology ==
The meaning of the term bhakti is analogous to but different from kama. Kama connotes emotional connection, sometimes with sensual devotion and erotic love. Bhakti, in contrast, is spiritual: a love and devotion to religious concepts or principles, that engages both emotion and intellection. Karen Pechelis states that the word bhakti should not be understood as uncritical emotion, but as committed engagement. She adds that, in the concept of bhakti in Hinduism, the engagement involves a simultaneous tension between emotion and intellection, "emotion to reaffirm the social context and temporal freedom, intellection to ground the experience in a thoughtful, conscious approach". One who practices bhakti is called a bhakta.

The term bhakti, in Vedic Sanskrit literature, has a general meaning of "mutual attachment, devotion, fondness for, devotion to" such as in human relationships, most often between beloved-lover, friend-friend, king-subject, parent-child. It may refer to devotion towards a spiritual teacher (Guru) as guru-bhakti, or to a personal God, or for spirituality without form (nirguna).

According to the Sri Lankan Buddhist scholar Sanath Nanayakkara, there is no single term in English that adequately translates or represents the concept of bhakti in Indian religions. Terms such as "devotion, faith, devotional faith" represent certain aspects of bhakti, but it means much more. The concept includes a sense of deep affection, attachment, but not wish because "wish is selfish, affection is unselfish". Some scholars, states Nanayakkara, associate it with saddha (Sanskrit: Sraddha) which means "faith, trust or confidence". However, bhakti can connote an end in itself, or a path to spiritual wisdom.

The term bhakti refers to one of several alternate spiritual paths to moksha (spiritual freedom, liberation, salvation) in Hinduism, and it is referred to as bhakti marga or bhakti yoga. The other paths are Jnana marga (path of knowledge), Karma marga (path of works), Rāja marga (path of contemplation and meditation).

The term bhakti has been usually translated as "devotion" in Orientalist literature. The colonial era authors variously described bhakti as a form of mysticism or "primitive" religious devotion of lay people with monotheistic parallels. However, modern scholars state "devotion" is a misleading and incomplete translation of bhakti.

Many contemporary scholars have questioned this terminology, and most now trace the term bhakti as one of the several spiritual perspectives that emerged from reflections on the Vedic context and Hindu way of life. Bhakti in Indian religions is not a ritualistic devotion to a God or to religion, but participation in a path that includes behavior, ethics, mores and spirituality. It involves, among other things, refining one's state of mind, knowing God, participating in God, and internalizing God. Increasingly, instead of "devotion", the term "participation" is appearing in scholarly literature as a gloss for the term bhakti.

Diverse ideas continue in Hinduism, where both saguni and nirguni bhakti (devotion to divine with or without attributes) or alternate paths to spirituality are among the options left to the choice of a Hindu.

== History of Hindu bhakti ==
=== The Upanishads ===
The last of three epilogue verses of the Shvetashvatara Upanishad (6.23), dated to be from 1st millennium BCE, uses the word Bhakti as follows:

yasya deve parā bhaktiḥ yathā deve tathā gurau ।
tasyaite kathitā hyarthāḥ prakāśante mahātmanaḥ

He who has highest Bhakti of Deva (God), just like his Deva, so for his Guru (teacher),
To him who is high-minded, these teachings will be illuminating.

This verse is one of the earliest use of the word Bhakti in ancient Indian literature, and has been translated as "the love of God". Scholars have debated whether this phrase is authentic or later insertion into the Upanishad, and whether the terms "Bhakti" and "Deva" meant the same in this ancient text as they do in the modern era. Max Muller states that the word Bhakti appears only once in this Upanishad, that too in one last verse of the epilogue, could have been a later addition and may not be theistic as the word was later used in much later Sandilya Sutras. Grierson as well as Carus note that the first epilogue verse 6.21 of the Shvetashvatara Upanishad is also notable for its use of the word Deva Prasada (देवप्रसाद, grace or gift of God), but add that Deva in the epilogue of the Shvetashvatara Upanishad refers to "pantheistic Brahman" and the closing credit to sage Shvetashvatara in verse 6.21 can mean "gift or grace of his Soul".

=== Post-Vedic movement ===
Scholarly consensus sees bhakti as a post-Vedic movement that developed primarily during the Hindu Epics and Puranas era of Indian history (late first mill. BCE-early first mill. CE).

The Bhagavad Gita is the first text to explicitly use the word "bhakti" to designate a religious path, using it as a term for one of three possible religious approaches or yogas (i.e. bhakti yoga).

The Bhagavata Purana (which focuses on Krishna bhakti) develops the idea more elaborately, while the Shvetashvatara Upanishad presents evidence of guru-bhakti (devotion to one's spiritual teacher).

=== Bhakti movement ===
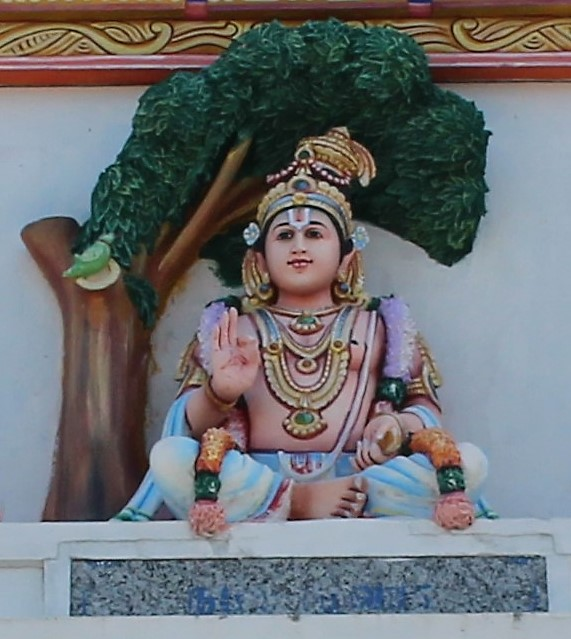
Nammalvar, one of the Alvars (Tamil poet saints c. 5th to 9th century CE)

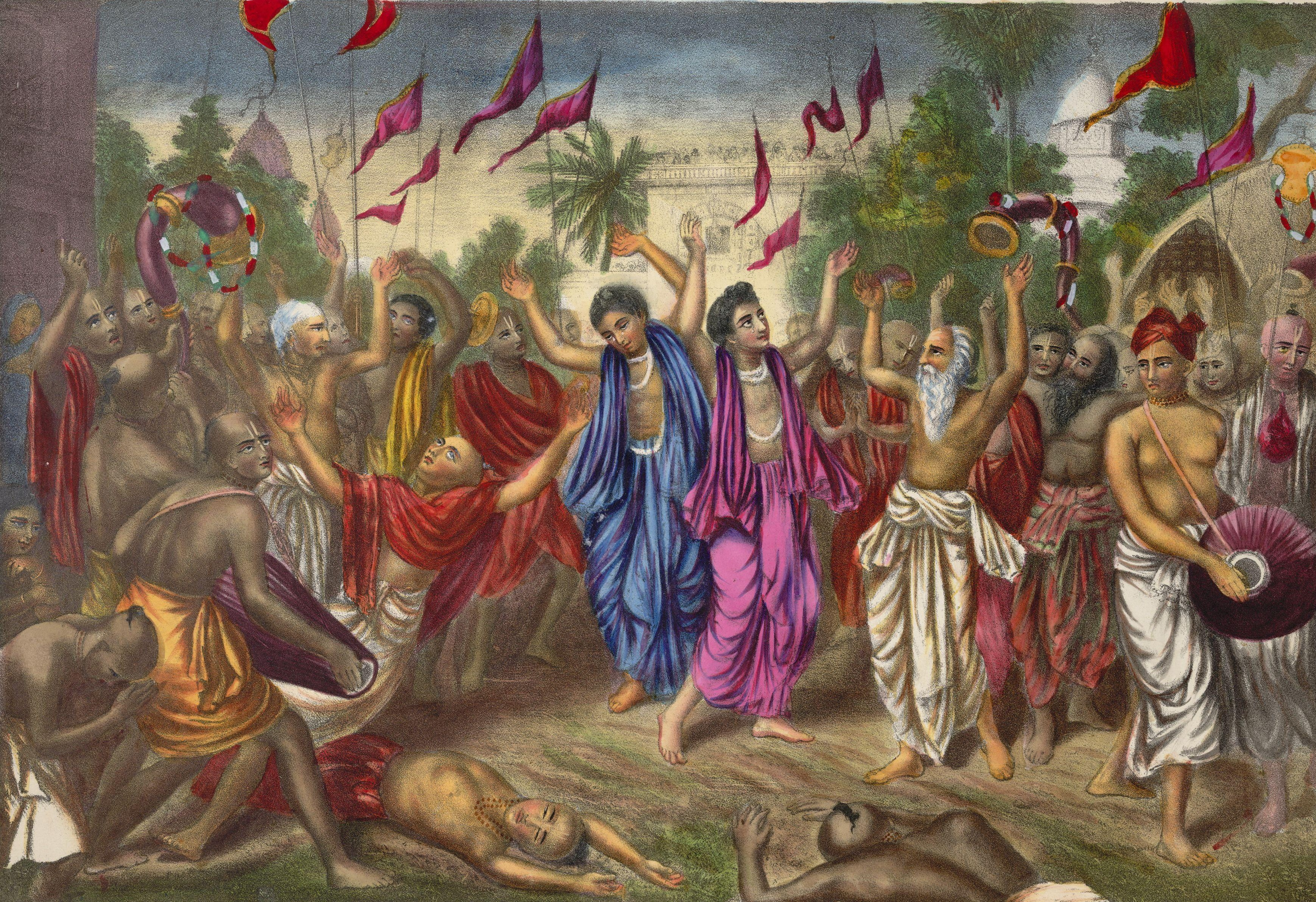
Chaitanya Mahaprabhu (1486-1524) chanting and dancing devotionally (19th century image).

The Bhakti Movement was a rapid growth of bhakti, first starting in the later part of 1st millennium CE, from Tamil Nadu in southern India with the Shaiva Nayanars and the Vaishnava Alvars. Their ideas and practices inspired bhakti poetry and devotion throughout India over the 12th-18th century CE. The Alvars ("those immersed in God") were Vaishnava poet-saints who wandered from temple to temple, singing the praises of Vishnu. They hailed the divine abodes of Vishnu and converted many people to Vaishnavism.

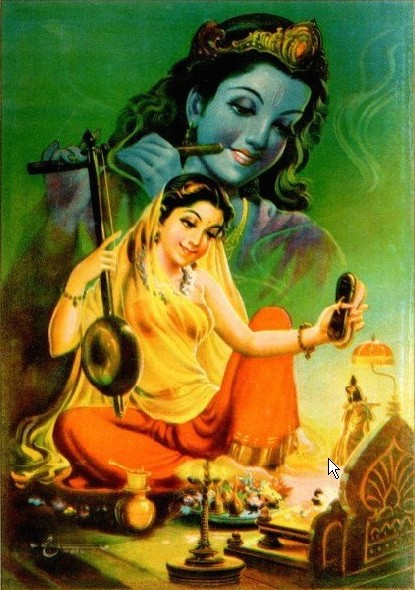
Mirabai (c. 1498-c. 1546), a poet-saint in the Vaishnava bhakti movement.

Like the Alvars, the Shaiva Nayanar poets were influential. The Tirumurai, a compilation of hymns by sixty-three Nayanar poets, is still of great importance in South India. Hymns by three of the most prominent poets, Appar (7th century CE), Campantar (7th century) and Sundarar (9th century), were compiled into the Tevaram, the first volumes of the Tirumurai. The poets' itinerant lifestyle helped create temple and pilgrimage sites and spread devotion to Shiva. Early Tamil-Shiva bhakti poets quoted the Krishna Yajurveda. The Alvars and Nayanars were instrumental in propagating the Bhakti tradition. The Bhagavata Purana's references to the South Indian Alvar saints, along with its emphasis on bhakti, have led many scholars to give it South Indian origins, though some scholars question whether this evidence excludes the possibility that bhakti movement had parallel developments in other parts of India.

Scholars state that the bhakti movement focused on Vishnu, Shiva, Shakti and other deities, that developed and spread in India, was in response to the arrival of Islam in India about 8th century CE, and subsequent religious violence. This view is contested by other scholars.

The Bhakti movement swept over east and north India from the fifteenth-century onwards, reaching its zenith between the 15th and 17th century CE. According to Patton Burchett, the four key features of this early modern bhakti movement in north India were:

First and foremost, these communities were united by a distinctive focus on personal devotion to the Divine, as opposed to other traditional pillars of Indic religiosity such as knowledge, ritual, or the practice of yoga or asceticism. This devotion took place in the context of an intimate, loving relationship with the Divine in which caste, class, or gender typically were said to have no place. This was a bhakti that found its most characteristic expression in (a) the context of spiritual fellowship (satsaṅg) with other devotees (bhaktas), (b) the medium of song, (c) the idiom of passionate love (śṛṅgāra/mādhurya) or painful separation (viraha), and (d) the remembrance—in meditation, recitation, chant, and song—of the name(s) of God. Second, these new devotional communities of Mughal India were alike in their production and performance of devotional works, composed in vernacular languages, remembering the deeds of God (especially Kṛṣṇa and Rām) and exemplary bhaktas. Third, important in all these communities was the performance and collection of songs attributed to renowned bhakti poet-saints like Kabīr, Raidās, and Sūrdās. Finally, despite their many differences, the vast majority of bhakti authors and sectarian communities in early modern North India came together in articulating a devotional sensibility distinct from—and often explicitly positioned in opposition to—certain tantric paradigms of religiosity.

Bhakti poetry and ideas influenced many aspects of Hindu culture, religious and secular, and became an integral part of Indian society. It extended its influence to Sufism, Christianity, and Jainism. Sikhism was founded by Guru Nanak in the 15th century, during the bhakti movement period, and scholars have identified it as drawing from many Bhakti traditions and ideas.

Poets including Mirabai, Soordas, Narsinh Mehta composed several bhajans that were a path towards Bhakti for many, that are universally sung even today. A modern age saint, Shri Devendra Ghia (Kaka) has composed about 10,000 hymns. These hymns are related to bhakti, knowledge, devotion, faith, introspection and honesty.

The movement has traditionally been considered as an influential social reformation in Hinduism, and provided an individual-focused alternative path to spirituality regardless of one's birth caste or gender. Postmodern scholars question this traditional view and whether the Bhakti movement were ever a social reform or rebellion of any kind. They suggest Bhakti movement was a revival, reworking and recontextualization of ancient Vedic traditions.

== In Hinduism ==
=== Bhakti Yoga ===
Bhakti is described as yoga because it is a means of connecting with God. Bhakti Yoga is described by Swami Vivekananda as "the path of systematized devotion for the attainment of union with the Absolute". The Bhagavad Gita introduces bhakti yoga in combination with karma yoga and jnana yoga. The Bhagavata Purana expands on bhakti yoga, offering nine specific activities for the bhakti yogi. Bhakti in the Bhagavad Gita offered an alternative to two dominant practices of religion at the time: the isolation of the sannyasin and the practice of religious ritual. In various chapters, including the twelfth chapter of the Bhagavad Gita, Krishna describes bhakti yoga as one of the paths to the highest spiritual attainments. In the sixth chapter, for example, the Gita states the following about bhakti yogi:

The yogi who, established in oneness, Honors Me as abiding in all beings,
In whatever way he otherwise acts, Dwells in Me.

He who sees equality in everything, In the image of his own Self, Arjuna,
Whether in pleasure or in pain, Is thought to be a supreme yogi.

Of all yogis, He who has merged his inner Self in Me,
Honors me, full of faith, Is thought to be the most devoted to Me.

The Shandilya Bhakti Sutra and Narada Bhakti Sutra define devotion, emphasize its importance and superiority, and classify its forms. The Narada Bhakti Sutra defines bhakti as supreme love.

According to Ramana Maharishi, bhakti is a "surrender to the divine with one's heart". It can be practiced as an adjunct to self-inquiry, and in one of four ways:

1. Atma-Bhakti: devotion to one's atma (Supreme Self)
2. Ishvara-Bhakti: devotion to a formless being (God, Cosmic Lord)
3. Ishta Devata-Bhakti: devotion to a personal God or goddess
4. Guru-Bhakti: devotion to Guru

=== Nine forms of Bhakti ===
The Bhagavata Purana (verse 7.5.23) teaches nine forms of bhakti:

1. śravaṇa (listening to ancient texts)
2. kīrtana (praying)
3. smaraṇa (remembering teachings in ancient texts)
4. pāda-sevana (service to the feet)
5. archana (worshiping)
6. namaskar or vandana (bowing to the divine)
7. dāsya (service to the divine)
8. sākhyatva (friendship with the divine)
9. ātma-nivedana (self-surrender to the divine)

Bhakti is taken as both the means to overcome maya (mistakenly believing the self to be the body) and the ultimate goal.

The Bhagavata Purana describes many examples of bhakti, such as those exhibited by Prahlada and the gopis. The behavior of the gopis in the Bhagavata Purana exemplifies the essence of bhakti. When separated from Krishna, the gopis practiced devotion by listening to his stories (śravaṇa), praising his glorious deeds (kīrtana), and other acts to keep him in their thoughts.

=== Bhavas ===
Traditional Hinduism speaks of five different bhāvas or "affective essences". In this sense, bhāvas are different attitudes that devotees takes according to their individual temperament to express devotion towards God in some form. The different bhāvas are:

1. śānta, placid love for God;
2. dāsya, the attitude of a servant;
3. sakhya, the attitude of a friend;
4. vātsalya, the attitude of a mother towards her child;
5. madhurya, the attitude of a woman towards her lover.

Several saints are known to have practiced these bhavas. The nineteenth century mystic, Ramakrishna is said to have practiced these five bhavas. The devotion of Hanuman towards Rama is considered to be of dasya bhava. The relationship of Arjuna and the cowherd boys of Vrindavan with Krishna is regarded as sakhya bhava. Radha's love towards Krishna is madhurya bhava. The affection of Krishna's foster-mother Yashoda towards him exemplifies vatsalya bhava. The Chaitanya Charitamrita mentions that Chaitanya came to distribute the four spiritual sentiments of Vraja loka: dasya, sakhya, vatsalya, and sringara. Sringara is the relationship of the intimate love.

=== Murti ===
In bhakti worship, rituals are primarily directed towards a murti, or vigraham. A murti denotes an object with a distinct form that symbolizes the shape or manifestation of a particular deity, either a god or goddess. A ritual called pranapratishta is performed before worshipping a murti, establishing prana (life force) into the image and inviting the god or goddess to reside in the murti.

=== Bhakti in the Teachings of Jagadgurus ===
Several Jagadgurus emphasized bhakti as the path to spiritual realisation.

- Nimbarkacharya emphasized devotion to Radha and Krishna, introducing Dvaitadvait Vad (dualistic non-dualism), which balanced divine oneness and personal devotion.
- Ramanujacharya taught prapatti (complete surrender) as a basis of bhakti to Vishnu per Vishishtadvait
- Madhvacharya, through his Dvait Vad (dualism), reinforced the idea that grace of a personal God was essential for liberation.
- Madhvacharya's teachings directly influenced Saint Purandara Dasa, a key figure in the Bhakti movement, linking his philosophy to the broader devotional wave that swept through India.
- Kripalu Ji Maharaj gave a new dimension to Bhakti practice in modern times with the method of Roopdhyan meditation, which involves meditating upon the divine forms and qualities of Radha-Krishna, stating that true worship stems from mental surrender and heartfelt love rather than external rituals.
- Bhakti has been a unifying spiritual approach through different Jagadguru philosophies, ultimately rejuvenating Sanātana Dharma in various ages.

== In other religions ==
Devotional elements similar to bhakti are also a part of religions such as Christianity, Islam, Buddhism and Judaism.

=== Buddhism ===
Bhakti (bhatti in Pali) has always been a common aspect of Buddhism, where offerings, prostrations, chants, and individual or group prayers are made to the Buddha and bodhisattvas, or to other Buddhist deities. According to Karel Werner Buddhist bhakti "had its beginnings in the earliest days". Perhaps the earliest mention of the term bhatti in all Indic literature appears in the early Buddhist Theragatha (Verses of the Elders). As such, Har Dayal writes that, bhakti "was an integral part of the Buddhist ideal from the earliest times". John S. Strong writes that the central meaning of Indian Buddhist bhakti was "recollection of the Buddha" (Sanskrit: buddhanusmrti).

One of the earliest form of Buddhist devotional practice was the early Buddhist tradition of worshiping the Buddha through the means of stupas and bodily relics (sarira). Later (after about the third century CE), devotion using Buddha images also became a very popular form of Buddha bhakti.

Sri Lankan scholar Indumathie Karunaratna notes that the meaning of bhatti changed throughout Buddhist history. In early Buddhist sources like the Theragāthā, bhatti had the meaning of 'faithful adherence to the [Buddhist] religion', and was accompanied with knowledge. Later on, however, the term developed the meaning of an advanced form of emotional devotion. This sense of devotion was thus different than the early Buddhist view of faith.

According to Sanath Nanayakkara, early Buddhist refuge and devotion, meant taking the Buddha as an ideal to live by, rather than the later sense of self-surrender. But already in the Commentary to the Abhidhamma text Puggalapaññatti, it is mentioned that the Buddhist devotee should develop his saddhā until it becomes bhaddi, a sense not mentioned in earlier texts and probably influenced by the Hindu idea of bhakti. There are instances where commentator Buddhaghosa mentions taking refuge in the Buddha in the sense of mere adoration, indicating a historical shift in meaning. Similar developments in Buddhist devotion took place with regards to worshipping the Buddha's relics and Buddha images.

The Mahāsāṃghika school of early Buddhism seems to have promoted devotional practice and bhakti to a high status and to have anchored this practice in the purity and radiance of the Buddha. The Mahāvastu, one of the few surviving Mahāsāṃghika texts, states:

The purity of the Buddha is so great that the worship of the Exalted One is sufficient for the attainment of Nirvāna, and that one already acquires endless merit by merely walking round a stupa and worshipping it by means of floral offerings...from the Buddha's smile, there radiate beams which illuminate the entire buddhafields.

In later faith-oriented literature, such as the Avadānas, faith is given an important role in Buddhist doctrine. Nevertheless, faith (śraddhā) is discussed in different contexts than devotion (bhakti). Bhakti is often used disparagingly to describe acts of worship to deities, often seen as ineffective and improper for a Buddhist. Also, bhakti is clearly connected with a person as an object, whereas śraddhā is less connected with a person, and is more connected with truthfulness and truth. Śraddhā focuses on ideas such as the working of karma and merit transfer. One source for Indian Buddhist devotion is the Divyāvadāna, which focuses on the vast amount of merit (puṇya) that is generated by making offerings to Buddhas, stupas and other Buddhist holy sites.

This text contrasts faith in the Buddha with bhakti for mundane deities (such as Hindu gods), and in this case, it sees bhakti as something for those who are less developed spiritually. However, in other passages, the term is used positively, and in one story, the sage Upagupta says to the demon Mara:

Even a very small bit of bhakti [toward the Buddha] offers nirvana to the wise as a result. In short, the wicked things that you [Māra] did here to the Sage, when your mind was blind with delusion, all of these have been washed away by the copious waters of śraddhā that have entered your heart. - Divyāvadāna 360.1–4 [Aśokāvadana 22.7-9]

In the 11th century, the Bengali Buddhist scholar Rāmancandra Kavibhārati composed a work on Buddhist bhakti called the Bhakti Śataka.

Today, affective devotion remains an important part of Buddhist practice, even in Theravada Buddhism. According to Winston King, a scholar on Theravāda in Myanmar, "warm, personalized, emotional" bhakti has been a part of the Burmese Buddhist tradition apart from the monastic and lay intellectuals. The Buddha is treasured by the everyday devout Buddhists, just like Catholics treasure Jesus. The orthodox teachers tend to restrain the devotion to the Buddha, but to the devout Buddhist populace, "a very deeply devotional quality" was and remains a part of the actual practice. This is observable, states King, in "multitudes of Pagoda worshippers of the Buddha images" and the offerings they make before the image and nowhere else.

==== In Mahayana Buddhism ====
A rich devotionalism developed in Indian Mahāyāna Buddhism and it can be found in the veneration of the transcendent Buddha Amitabha of Pure Land Buddhism and of bodhisattvas like Mañjusri, Avalokiteshvara (known as Guanyin in East Asia and Chenrezig in Tibetan) and Tara. Mahayana sources like the Lotus Sutra describe the Buddha as the loving father of all beings, and exhorts all Buddhists to worship him.

Mahayana bhakti also led to the rise of temples which were focused on housing a central Buddha image, something which became the norm during the Gupta period. Gupta era Indian Mahāyāna Buddhism stressed bhakti towards the Buddha as a central virtue and liberally made use of Buddha images, which are often accompanied by attendant bodhisattvas.

These new developments in Buddhist bhakti may have been influenced by the pan-Indian bhakti movement, and indeed, many Gupta monarchs, who were devoted to the Vaishnava Bhagavata religion also supported Buddhist temples and founded monasteries (such as Nalanda). Buddhists were in competition with the Hindu religions of the time, like the Bhagavatas and Shaivas, and they developed Buddhist bhakti focused on the Buddhas and bodhisattvas in this religious environment.

Mahāyāna interprets Buddhahood as a transcendent and eternal state (as found in the Lotus Suta) and is also equated with the ultimate reality (Dharmakaya). Bodhisattvas were also considered to be extremely powerful divinities that could grant boons and rescue people from danger. This shift towards devotion to a transcendent being in later Buddhism has been seen as being similar to theistic forms of Hindu bhakti. Mahayana Buddhist bhakti was also sometimes aimed at a Mahayana sutra, such as the Prajñaparamita sutra and the Lotus Sutra.

Some sources, like the Sukhāvatīvyūhasūtra, even state that through devotion to the Buddha Amitabha one can attain rebirth in his Pure Land and here one can be purified of all negative karma and eventually attain Buddhahood. As such, they make Buddha bhakti a central element of their soteriology. Bhakti in these sutras supersedes the making of good karma and cultivation of the path in favor of devotion to the Buddha Amitabha who can lead one to liberation in the Pure Land. This eventually came to be seen as its own path to liberation, its own mārga, often called the "easy path". A text attributed to Nagarjuna, the *Dasabhumikavibhāsā (Chinese: Shí zhù pípóshā lùn 十住毘婆沙論, T.1521) teaches the "easy practice" which is simply being constantly mindful of the Buddhas.

All of these ideas became the foundation for the later development of East Asian Pure Land Buddhism.

Mahayana Buddhist bhakti is grounded in the Mahayana ideals of the bodhisattva, bodhicitta (the mind aimed at awakening for the benefit of all beings) and skillful means (upaya). Mahayana bhakti practices include various forms of ritual pujas and prayers. The Mahayana form of the practice of Buddhānusmṛti (remembering the Buddha) could include visualization practices and recitation of the names of a Buddha or bodhisattva (as in nianfo) was also a common method of devotional practice taught in numerous Indian sources.

One common puja and prayer format in Indian Mahayana was the "seven part worship" (saptāṇgapūjā or saptavidhā anuttarapūjā). This often included various offerings of flowers, food, scents, and music. This ritual form is visible in the works of Shantideva (8th century) and includes:

- Vandana (obeisance, bowing)
- Puja (ritual worship with offerings etc.)
- Sarana-gamana (going for refuge)
- Papadesana (confession of bad deeds)
- Punyanumodana (rejoicing in merit of the good deeds of oneself and others)
- Adhyesana (prayer, entreaty) and yacana (supplication) – request to Buddhas and Bodhisattvas to continue preaching Dharma
- Atmabhavadi-parityagah (surrender) and pariṇāmanā (the transfer of one's Merit to the welfare of others)

Devotion to the Buddhas and bodhisattvas continued to be a major part of the later Vajrayana Buddhist traditions of tantra. Vajrayana Buddhism also added another form of bhakti to their teachings: guru bhakti (i.e. guru yoga), devotion towards the tantric guru. In India, various forms of devotion were practiced, including tantric songs of realization called Charyagitis. These first arose in the so called Charyapadas of medieval Bengali Sahajiya Buddhism.

As such, both in Tibetan Buddhism and East Asian Buddhism, there remains a strong tradition of devotional veneration of various Buddhas and bodhisattvas (which includes making offerings and chanting their names or mantras), and this is one of the most popular forms of lay Buddhist practice.

=== Jainism ===
Bhakti has been a prevalent ancient practice in various Jaina sects, wherein learned Tirthankara (Jina) and human gurus have been venerated with offerings, songs and Āratī prayers.

Jainism participated in the Bhakti school of medieval India, and has a rich tradition of bhakti literature (stavan) though these have been less studied than those of the Hindu tradition. Most Jain poems aimed at evoking peacefulness (sānta rasa) in the listener. The Avasyaka sutra of Jains includes, among ethical duties for the devotee, the recitation of "hymns of praise to the Tirthankaras" as the second Obligatory Action. It explains this bhakti as one of the means to destroy negative karma. According to Paul Dundas, such textual references to devotional activity suggests that bhakti was a necessary part of Jainism from an early period.

According to Jeffery D. Long, along with its strong focus on ethics and ascetic practices, the religiosity in Jainism has had a strong tradition of bhakti or devotion just like their Hindu counterparts. The Jain community built ornate temples and prided in public devotion for its fordmakers, saints and teachers. Abhisekha, festival prayers, community recitals and Murti puja (rituals before an image) are examples of integrated bhakti in Jain practice. Some Jain monks, however, reject Bhakti.

=== Sikhism ===
Bhakti is an important term in Sikhism. The term appears as bhagti (Punjabi: ਭਗਤੀ) in the Guru Granth Sahib; there, it never appears alongside the terms nirgun or sargun. David N. Lorenzen writes that bhakti of nirguni (which he considers as devotion to the divine without attributes) is particularly significant in Sikhism, and Sikhism is derived from it.. However, Hardip Singh Syan writes that mainstream Sikh Gurus developed a separate conception of bhakti opposed to the existing social structure. The Mina sect, which vehemently opposed mainstream Sikhism and the Khalsa, merged Sikh bhakti with Vaishnavite bhakti with the opposite aim, while producing literary works that affirmed traditional bhakti values.

== Bhakta ==
Bhakta (Sanskrit: भक्त) or bhakt (भक्त) is a devotee or worshiper in Hinduism, characterized by a deep, emotional, and personal connection to the divine. Bhaktas often express their faith through various means, including poetry, music, and active participation in worship. The Sanskrit word bhakta comes from the root "bhaj", which means "to serve". In the Rigveda, "bhakta" originally meant a share or portion received by a worshiper from a deity. Later Vedic texts used it to mean someone who shares. The more common devotional meaning of related term bhakti as devotion, love, service, or attachment to a deity emerged with texts such as Bhagavata Purana.

In the Bhakti traditions, saints like the Nayanmars and North Indian saints such as Kabir and Mirabai wrote poetry in local languages, expressing deep emotional devotion to God, creating a distinct Bhakta community within Hinduism. They use intimate language, often defying social norms, and see the divine presence in everyday lives and local surroundings.

Krishna defines a bhakta as one who does not perform devotion for others to see. The Bhagavad Gita verses 7.16-19 identifies four types of devotees (bhaktas) who engage in devotion:

- Arta (the distressed): Those who seek divine help in times of suffering.
- Jijnasu (the seeker of knowledge): Those who worship to gain spiritual understanding.
- Artharthi (the seeker of worldly success): Those who seek prosperity or material benefits through devotion.
- Jnani (the one who possesses knowledge): Those who have realized higher spiritual knowledge and are singularly devoted.

Of the four, Krishna identifies jnani as the highest devotee.

The Bhagavata Purana emphasizes the difference between devotee and God. The Bhagavata Purana lists twenty-one individuals as great devotees, who devoted to Krishna from a young age. Parikshit and Uddhava are noted as great devotees for their enthusiasm toward receiving instruction. Prahlada is an example of a great devotee; although born an asura, he does not have asuric qualities. Vopada delineates nine types of bhaktas, each one corresponding to the nine rasas. He gives examples of each type of bhakta from the Bhagavata Purana.

The bhakta can express their relationship to God through forms such as the relationship of a servant to lord, friend to friend, child to parent, or beloved to lover. In Tamil contexts, the relationship is frequently expressed as a relationship between a subject and king.

The term bhakt may be used by the contemporary Indian media in a political context to refer to ardent supporters of Indian Prime Minister Narendra Modi or the BJP, particularly those who resort to deification and are therefore sometimes uncritical in their support.

== See also ==
- Bhajan
- Kirtan
- Buddhist chant
- Buddhist devotion
- Awgatha - Burmese Buddhist Devotion
- Novena – a form of devotion to Blessed Mary, Christ or a saint in Christianity over nine successive days or weeks
- Kavanah – intention, devotion during prayer in Judaism
- Mettā
- Ravidassia religion
- Shaiva Siddhanta
- Bhakti movement

== Sources ==
- Dayal, Har (1970). The Bodhisattva Doctrine in Buddhist Sanskrit Literature. Motilal Banarsidass. ISBN 978-0-89684-032-4.
- Frawley, David (2000), Vedantic Meditation: Lighting the Flame of Awareness, North Atlantic Books
- Lorenzen, David N. (1995). Bhakti Religion in North India: Community Identity and Political Action. New York: SUNY Press. ISBN 978-0-7914-2025-6.
- Nanayakkara, S. K. (1966), "Bhakti", in Malalasekera, Gunapala Piyasena (ed.), Encyclopaedia of Buddhism, vol. II, Government of Ceylon
