= Angara Range =

Mountain range in Russia

Angara Range Ангарский кряж
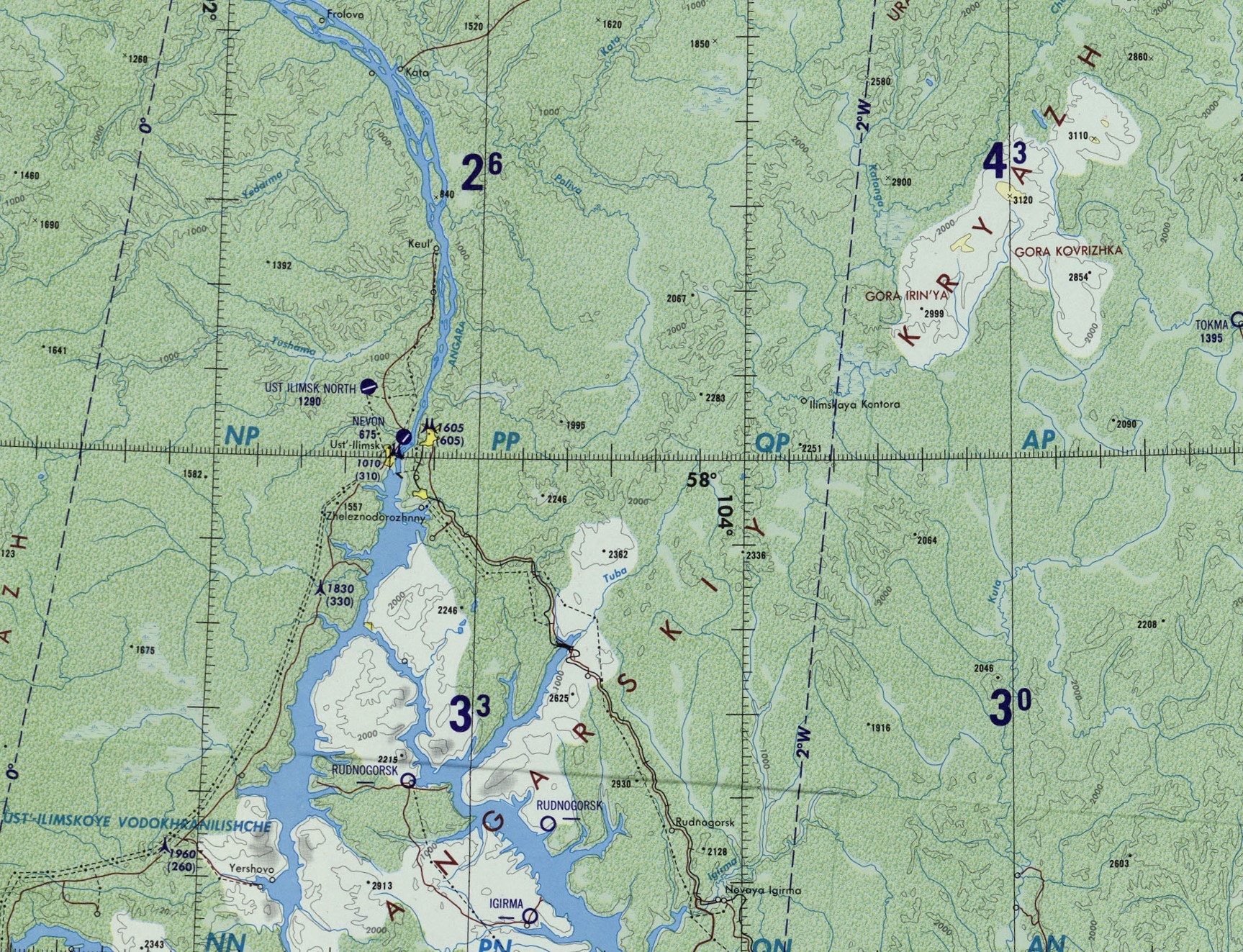
- Map section showing the stretch of the range crossed by the Angara river flowing northwards

Highest point
- Peak: Unnamed
- Elevation: 1,022 m (3,353 ft)

Dimensions
- Length: 800 km (500 mi) SW-NE
- Width: 50 km (31 mi)

Geography
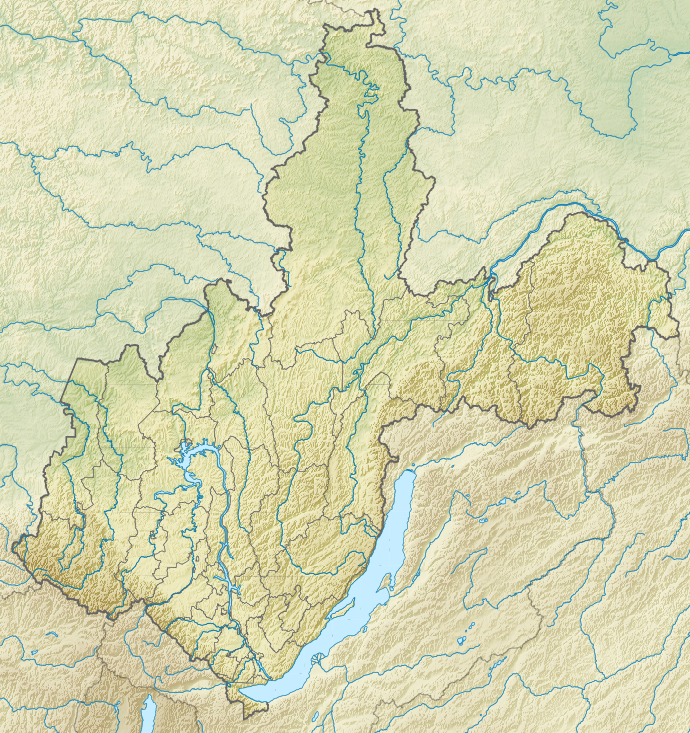
- Location within Irkutsk Oblast
- Country: Russia
- Federal subject: Krasnoyarsk Krai / Irkutsk Oblast
- Range coordinates: 57°0′N 102°45′E
- Parent range: Central Siberian Plateau

Geology
- Rock age: Lower Paleozoic
- Rock type: Crystalline rocks with granite intrusions

The Angara Range (Russian: Ангарский кряж) is a mountain range in Krasnoyarsk Krai and Irkutsk Oblast, Russia, part of the Central Siberian Plateau.

There are large iron ore deposits in the area of the Angara Range.

== Geography ==
The Angara Range is made up of hills of moderate height roughly aligned from southwest to northeast in the southeastern part of the Central Siberian Plateau. It stretches for about 800 kilometres (500 mi) from the northern foothills of the Eastern Sayan in the east to the upper basin of the Lower Tunguska river. To the east and southeast the range smoothly merges with the higher Lena-Angara Plateau. The highest summit is an unnamed 1,022 metres (3,353 ft) high peak located in the southern part. The middle stretch of the range has lower maximum altitudes, which increase in the northern part where 912 metres (2,992 ft) high Irina Peak is located.

The ridges of the range are roughly parallel, They have gently sloping interfluves, composed of Lower Paleozoic carbonate rocks, terrigenous sediments and stratigraphic traps.

=== Hydrography ===
The southern and central areas of the range are drained by a few left and right tributaries of the Angara which form small waterfalls and rapids when crossing the trap zones. The Lower Tunguska and Stony Tunguska rivers, right tributaries of the Yenisei, originate in the northern slopes.

== Flora ==
The hills of the range are mainly covered with larch taiga in the northeastern part of the range, with pine, fir and Siberian Pine in the southwestern section.

== See also ==
- List of mountains and hills of Russia
