= Vyacheslav Shishkov =

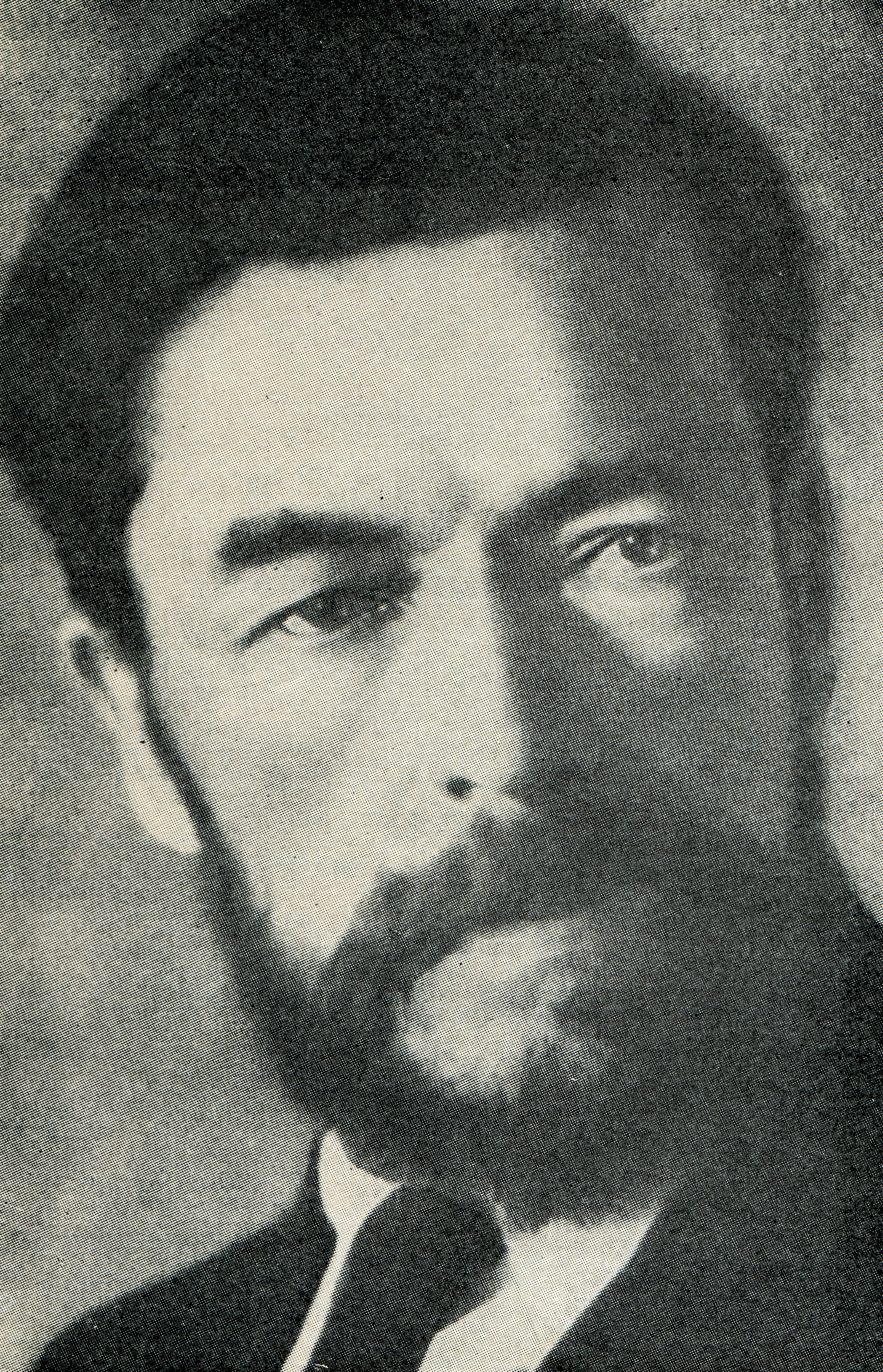
Shishkov in 1910s

Vyacheslav Yakovlevich Shishkov (Russian: Вячесла́в Я́ковлевич Шишко́в) (October 3 [O.S. September 21] 1873—March 6, 1945) was a Russian and Soviet writer known for his descriptions of Siberia. He was awarded the Stalin State Prize posthumously in 1946.

Shishkov was born in Bezhetsk in the Tver Governorate of the Russian Empire into a merchant family. In 1891 he graduated from the Vyshny Volochyok Civil Engineering College (Vyshnevolotskoe uchilishche konduktorov putei soobshcheniya). After working for short periods in Novgorod and Vologda Governorates, in 1894 he came to work for the Tomsk District department of waterways. He participated in geodetic expeditions and from 1903 was a supervisor of many of them, studying the Ob, Yenisei, Chulym, Charysh, Lena, Vitim, and other Siberian rivers; of particular importance for him, both as an engineer and as a writer, was his work on the Biya River and on the route of the future Chuya highway. His first publication was the story "Cedar" (1908) in Siberian Life (Tomsk); following this, he published a number of travel essays and short stories. He began an active literary career in 1913 and moved to Petrograd in 1915, where he became friends with Maxim Gorky. In 1916 with Gorky's assistance he published his first collection of short stories, Sibirskii skaz ("Siberian skaz").

After the October Revolution, about which he felt apprehension, he spent some time wandering around Russia (in the Luga district, Smolensk, Kostroma, and Crimea). He visited the city of Ostashkov, where he began work on his novel Ugryum-reka ("Ugryum River" or "Grim River"), a historical novel about wealthy Siberian merchants at the turn of the century which was published in two volumes in 1933. His first published novel, however, was Vataga ("The gang," 1923). From 1927 he lived in Detskoye Selo near Leningrad. For the last seven years of his life he worked on the historical epic Yemelyan Pugachev (Russian: Емельян Пугачёв), "a colorful panorama of the 18th-century Cossack and peasant uprising," whose first volume he published in 1941 while he was living in blockaded Leningrad; it was published (unfinished) in three volumes after his death and won him the Stalin Prize. He left Leningrad in April 1942 and his seventieth birthday was celebrated in Moscow in October 1943; on this occasion he was awarded the Order of Lenin. After his death in 1945 he was buried in Moscow at the Novodevichy Cemetery (site number 2). In 1950 a monument to him was unveiled in Bezhetsk, and in 1973 a museum dedicated to him was opened there.

Biographies and critical works have been written by V. Bakhmetev (1947), A. Bogdanova (1953), I. Izotov (1956), V. Chalmayev (1969), N. Yeselev (1976), and N. Yanovsky (1984).

The exile critic D. S. Mirsky wrote of him in a 1924 overview of "Russian fiction since Chekhov": "Vyacheslav Shishkov, a Siberian, is notable for his good Russian, a worthy pupil of Remizov and Prishvin."

== Selected works ==
- Blizzard (Пурга, 1927, novella)
- The Wanderers (Странники, 1931, novel)
- Gloomy River (Угрюм-река, 1933, novel)
- Yemelyan Pugachev (Емельян Пугачёв, 1947, posthumously)

== English translations ==
- Children of Darkness, Victor Gollancz Ltd 1931; Hyperion Press 1973 (translation of Filʹka i Amelʹka, the first part of The Wanderers)
- Children of the Street, Strathcona Publishing Co, 1979.
