= The Wanderers (Shishkov novel) =

1931 novel by Vyacheslav Shishkov

- Author: Vyacheslav Shishkov
- Original title: Странники
- Language: Russian
- Publisher: Leningrad Writers' Publishers
- Publication date: 1931
- Publication place: Soviet Union
- Media type: Print (Paperback & Hardback)

The Wanderers (Russian: Странники, romanized: Stranniki) is a 1931 novel by Vyacheslav Shishkov, telling the story of the two homeless boys in the Soviet Union of the 1920s.

Part one of the novel, Filka and Amelka (Russian: Филька и Амелька) was first published in 1930 by Krasnaya Nov (issues 4-6), originally as a finished novella. Complete with parts two and three, "The Darkness Gives Way" (Мрак дрогнул) and "Labour" (Труд), respectively, the novel came out as a separate edition in 1931 via the Leningrad Writers' Publishers.

Shishkov started working on The Wanderers in 1928, inspired by a letter he'd received from a young man from Simferopol, telling him about his life as a teenage tramp. What was supposed to be a short story has grown up into first a novella and then a novel. One of its working titles was Free Birds' Way (Путь вольных птиц). Shishkov did a lot of research and spent himself a long time on the road, meeting groups and communities of homeless people all over the country.

In an April 1930 letter he wrote: "Today is my first day at the writing desk after a week spent with flu. Caught it during my two-day inspection of a prison in Leningrad. Am going to continue this inspection, when I get better. I need this for the second part of my novella Free Birds' Way."

Upon its release the novel received a warm welcome. "A large, 500-pages book of mine has just come out. Everybody seems to like it, both the men of letters and general readership," Shishkov informed V.P. Petrov by a letter, on 25 September 1931.
