= Conquest of the Khanate of Sibir =

1582 first Russian conquest in Siberia

Russian conquest of Khanate of Sibir
- Part of the Russian conquest of Siberia
| Date | 1582–1598 |
| Location | Modern day Siberia, Russia |
| Result | Russian victory |
| Territorial changes | Dissolution and annexation of the Khanate of Sibir |

Belligerents
| Tsardom of Russia | Khanate of Sibir |

Commanders and leaders
| (Tsardom of Russia) Yermak Timofeyevich † (Tsardom of Russia) Andrey Voyeykov | (Khanate of Sibir) Kuchum Khan |

Khanate of Sibir

The Khanate of Sibir was a Muslim state located just east of the middle Ural Mountains. Its conquest by Yermak Timofeyevich in 1582 was the first event in the Russian conquest of Siberia.

== Background and context ==
=== Russia ===
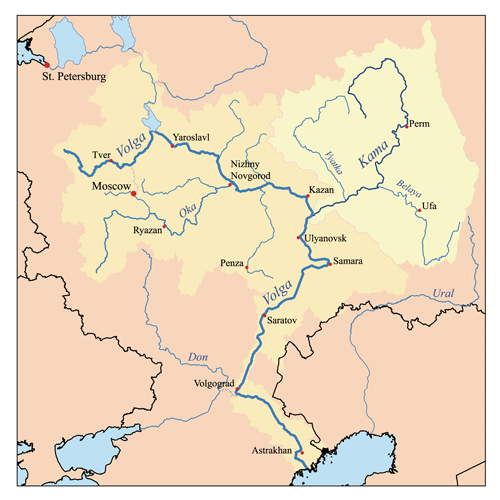
West of the Urals: The Kama River and Perm

The republic of Novgorod developed a fur-trading empire across northern Russia as far as the northern Urals and somewhat beyond. East of Novgorod the land was gradually falling under the control of Moscow. Between Moscow and the Urals was the Khanate of Kazan which broke off from the Golden Horde about 1438. In 1478 Moscow captured Novgorod and in 1552, Kazan. This opened up the Perm and Kama River area northeast of Kazan. In 1558 the Stroganovs were given a large fief in the area and began to develop it. There was scattered native resistance. In 1573 the Khan of Sibir sent his nephew to raid the Stroganov lands. Moscow responded with a charter that effectively authorized the Stroganovs to launch a private war against the Khan, but this was not acted on.

=== Siberia ===
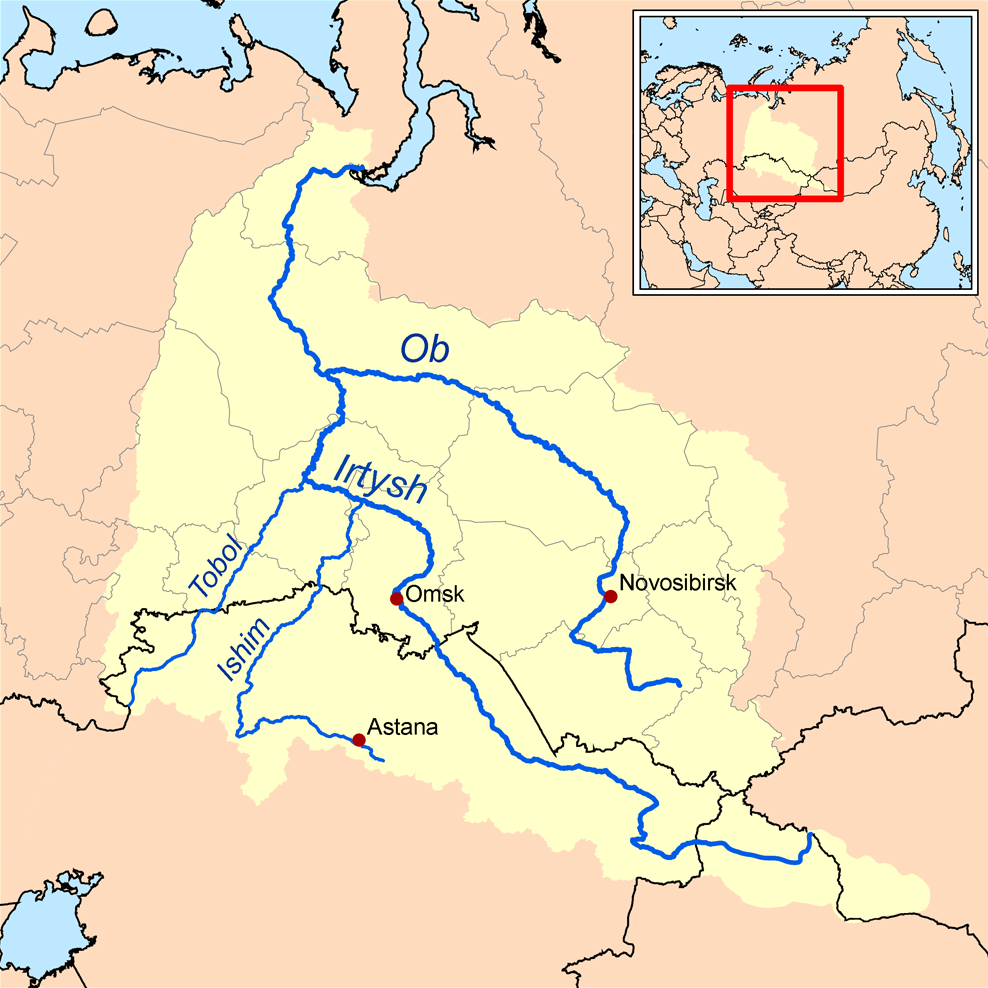
The area between the Tobol and Ob is part of the Irtysh. The Tura and Tavda Rivers flow into the Tobol.

The middle Urals at the latitude of Perm are fairly low and easy to cross. The area was inhabited by the Voguls (Mansi) and, north of Tobolsk, the Ostyaks (Khanty people). At some date a group of Siberian Tatars established the Khanate of Sibir and formed a military ruling class over a non-Muslim population. These 'Tatars' were partly Turko-Mongol Muslims from further south and partly local converts to Islam. Two clans contended for power. The Shaybanids were descendants of Genghis Khan. The Taibugids were probably of local origin. In 1563 Kuchum, a Shaybanid, defeated his Taibugid opponent and seized the throne. Before 1571 the Khanate paid limited tribute to Moscow.

=== Historiography ===
The Siberian Chronicles are incomplete and contradictory as are the secondary sources in English. George V. Lantzeff and Richard A. Pierce's Eastward to Empire (1973) is one of the fuller accounts in English, and follows S. V. Bakhruskin. The main questions are the year the expedition started, details of the route, and the location of the battle at Sibir.

== Capture of Sibir ==
Ermak was a Cossack who began his career as a river pirate somewhere on the Volga. In about 1577, the pirates were dispersed by Muscovy. Ermak arrived at Perm sometime later (possibly 1579). His purpose in invading Siberia is not clear. It seems to have been a sort of reconnaissance in force that evolved into a conquest when the Khanate proved weak. It is not clear whether Ermak went on his own initiative, whether he was sent by the Stroganovs, or the Stroganovs encouraged him to go to get rid of a dangerous body of armed men. Ermak commanded 540 Cossacks. The Stroganovs provided most of the supplies and another 300 men, mostly so-called 'Litva', or prisoners-of-war held by the Stroganovs.

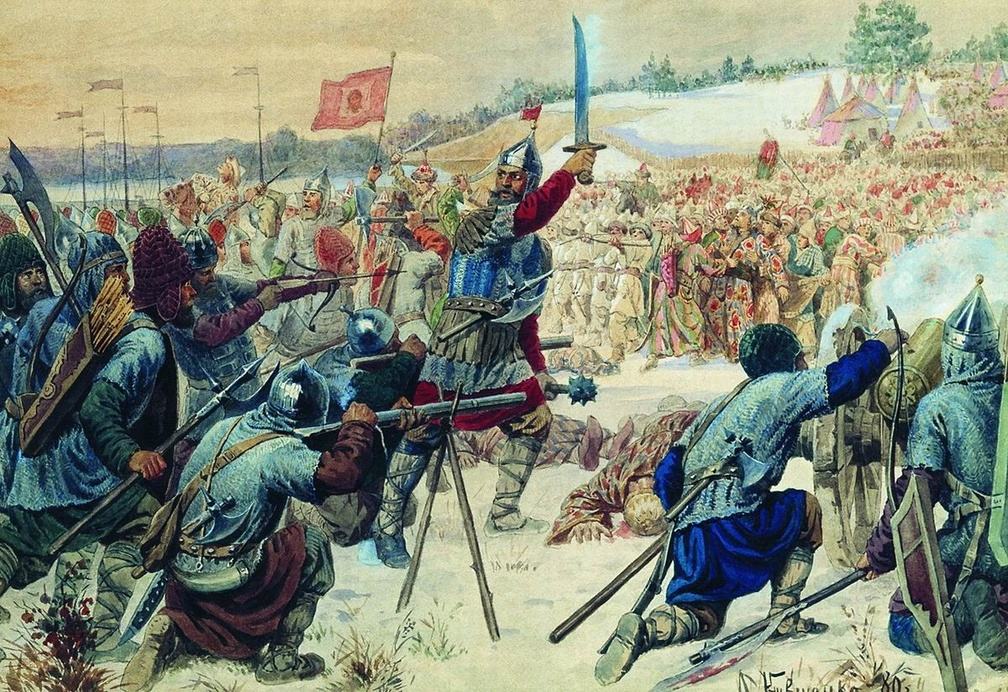
Conquest of the Khanate of Sibir, by Aleksey Kivshenko

Ermak left Perm probably in the summer of 1581. (Fisher has him start in September 1579 and take Sibir in October 1581; Lincoln has Ermak leave on 1 September 1582, and conquer Sibir three months later. Naumov says that late twentieth century historians established 1582 as the starting date, but this leaves little time for boatbuilding on the Tura if Sibir was captured in 1582, a date which Naumov accepts.) He sailed south down the Chusovaya River. When the river grew shallow and the weather turned cold he built winter quarters in the mountains. Here he raided the local Mansi, news of which provoked native opposition later on. In the spring he crossed the Urals to the Barancha River (according to Lantzeff, but the Barancha is somewhat north of the latitude of Perm). He built rafts, sailed down the river, and converted the rafts to boats when the river grew deep enough. Entering the Tura River he sailed downstream (southeast) and defeated a native prince named Epancha at the later site of Turinsk. (Naumov has Ivan Koltso and 300 men, probably Stroganov's 300, join Ermak at this point, but other sources do not mention this). Continuing down the Tura, he captured Tyumen (according to the Remizov chronicle, but Bakhruskin thinks that the fort here had been abandoned). On reaching the Tobol River they defeated a native force, sailed downstream (north) and later won two other battles before reaching the mouth of the Tavda River. Twenty miles below the Tavda they fought another battle and then captured a native village where they rested for a month.

Leaving camp, they sailed 12 miles down the Tobol to its junction with the Irtysh River at the modern Tobolsk. 12 miles east up the Irtysh was Sibir. The Russians captured the village of Atik-Murza for a base and unsuccessfully attacked Sibir. Several days later they attacked again. The commander, Mamet-Kul, was wounded which led to disorganization. The Ostyaks broke first, and then the Voguls, leaving only the Tatars. Kuchum fled during the night and the Russians entered his capital the next morning. This was probably in October 1582. The Russians had lost 107 men. Grousset has the battle at 'a fortified camp at the mouth of the Tobol to protect the approaches to Sibir'. Naumov has it 'not far from Sibir'. A fort may have guarded the town further upriver, but the matter is not clear.

== Occupation ==
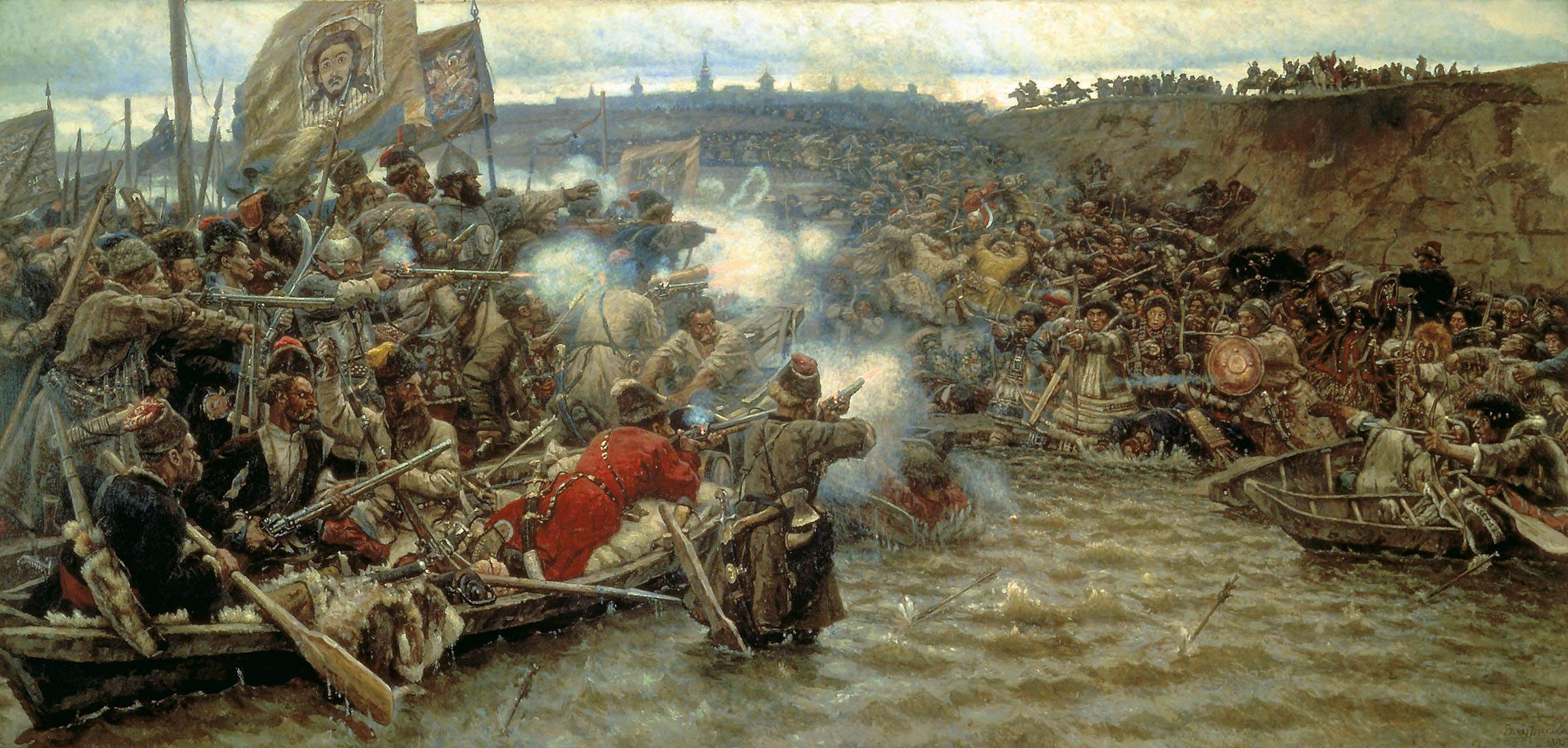
"Yermak's conquest of Siberia", a painting by Russian artist Vasily Surikov

Over the next several months various native chieftains offered their submission. Ermak, perhaps unexpectedly, found himself the ruler of a Khanate and sent Ivan Koltso, 50 men, and 5,200 furs to Moscow to announce his conquest. Meanwhile, the Ostyaks and Voguls had been raiding the Perm territories. Ivan the Terrible thought that Ermak had provoked that and sent an angry letter to the Stroganovs that demanded Ermak's recall to protect Perm. A few days later, Ermak's envoys reached Moscow. The Tsar immediately changed his mind and promised to send a Voyevoda and troops. He sent Ermak gifts, including the famous suit of armor.

The Cossacks sent out raiding parties to collect Yasak. Bogdan Bryazga went north down the Irtysh as far as its junction with the Ob. Ermak explored the Tavda.

Kuchum's whereabouts at the time is uncertain. His nephew, Mamet-Kul, attacked the Russians several times, but was captured on the Vagai River and sent to Moscow, where he later had an honorable career under the name Sibirsky. Seid Akhmat, Kuchum's Taibugid rival, returned to the area and gained some supporters. 'The Karacha' (one of Kuchum's former officials) sent a request to Ermak for help in fighting the steppe nomads. When the forty Cossacks under Ivan Koltso arrived, they were murdered. A punitive expedition was defeated, which seems to have set off a general uprising and it became unsafe to leave the fort at Sibir. About this time (November 1584) 500 reinforcements, including Streltsy, arrived from Russia. Food was inadequate and there were many deaths over the winter. In March the Karacha besieged Sibir. Two months later, it was broken by a sortie (Naumov has the sortie in March).

In August 1585, Ermak heard that a caravan was arriving from the south and that Kuchum was waiting to plunder it. He went up the Irtysh to capture either the caravan or Kuchum but found that there was no caravan. Returning, he camped at the mouth of the Vagai River about 25 miles upstream from Tobolsk. The night was stormy and the watch inadequate. Kuchum's men attacked and most of the Russians were killed in their sleep. The story, which may be true, is that Ermak tried to flee to a river boat and was drowned by the weight of the armor that the Tsar had sent him.

== Abandonment of Sabir ==
Command passed to Ivan Glukhov. With only 150 surviving men, he thought it was impossible to hold out and so he sailed down the Irtysh and Ob and crossed into Russia over the northern Urals. Ali, Kuchum's son, reoccupied the town but was driven out by Seid Akhmat (referred to as "Seidiak" by Naumov).

Reinforcements under Mansurov arrived but were not strong enough to do anything. They wintered somewhere on the Ob and crossed the Urals the following spring, in 1586 (Naumov has Glukhov and Mansurov meeting and returning to Russia together).

== Reoccupation ==
Ermak had failed, but the Khanate of Sibir had been broken up, and Seid Akhmat could not restore it. The area was left to native chiefs, who had few firearms. The Russians' policy was based on systematic fort-building and were using that method to expand south of Moscow. In 1586, three hundred Russians built an Ostrog (fortress) at Tyumen, and in 1587, they built another fort at Tobolsk. In 1588, Seid Akhmat and the Karacha were invited to Tobolsk, captured, and sent to Moscow.

In 1594, Tara was built on the middle Irtysh to guard the caravan route. In 1591, the Konda River Mansi were annexed. In 1594 Surgut, at the junction of the Ob and the Irtysh was founded. That year, the Prince of Pelym was defeated.

Kuchum made a number of attacks but was defeated on the Barabinsk Steppe, probably in 1598. That year, Verkhoturye was built to secure the route over the Urals. In the 1590s, the Russians crossed the northern Urals into the lower Ob basin. Ketsk was founded in 1602, opening the route to the Yenisei River.

== See also ==
- Siberian River Routes
- History of Siberia
