= List of Sibir khans =

Two dynasties, the Taibugha and the Shaybanid dynasty of Sibir ruled the Khanate one after the other, bringing breaks in each other's continuity of rule.

Name	Reign	Dynasty
Taibuga	1220 - ?	Taibughid
Khoja bin Taibugha (خواجه)	?	Taibughid
Tokhtamysh (توقتمش)	1396 - 1406	Tuqa-Timur
Chekre Khan (چکره)	1407 - 1413	Tuqa-Timur
Hajji Muhammad (حاجی محمد)	1420 - 1428	Shaybanid
Abu'l-Khayr Khan (ابو الخیر خان ابن دولت شیخ ابن ابراهیم خان)	1428 - 1468	Shaybanid
Mar (عمر)	1468 - 1480	Taibughid
Ibak Khan (سید ابراهیم خان)	1468 - 1495	Shaybanid
Mamuq of Kazan (ماموق)	1495 – 1496	Shaybanid
Muhammad Taibuga (محمد)	1495 – 1502	Taibughid
Abalak of Sibir	1496 – 1501	Shaybanid
Aguish	1502 - 1503	Taibughid
Kuluk Sultan	1502 – 1530	Shaybanid
Qasim (قاسم)	1504 - 1530	Taibughid
Yadgar bin Qasim (یادگار بن قاسم); Bey Pulad ibn Qasim (بیگ پولاد ابن قاسم), possible co-ruler	1530 - 1563	Taibughid
Kuchum Khan (کوچم)	1563 - 1598	Shaybanid

Yermak Timofeyevich, a Cossack, led the first campaign of Russian conquest of Siberia during the reign of Ivan the Terrible in 1580–1582. However, Kuchum Khan returned briefly and attacked Yermak on August 6, 1584 in the dead of night and killed most of his army. Finally, in August 1598, Küçhüm Khan was defeated at the Battle of Urmin near the River Ob. In the course of the fight the Siberian royal family were captured by the Russians. However, Küçhüm Khan escaped yet again. The Russians took the family members of Küçhüm Khan to Moscow and there they remained as hostages. The descendants of the khan's family became known as the Princes Sibirsky and the family is known to have survived until at least the late 19th Century. The struggle for dominance in the region continued for several years by the Taibughid successor Syed Ahmed Khan and the Shaybanid successor Ali ibn Kuchum Khan as well as the Russians.

== Family of Taibugha ==
- Taibuga
- Khoja
  - Mar (son of Khoja) (Umar, Omar) - (his sister married to Ibak Khan (1450? - 1480?))
    - Obder (Oder, Ader) - Mar's son (died in Ibak Khan's captivity)
      - Mamuq - son of Obder (1496? - 1502?)
        - Qasim of Sibir (son of Mamuq (1502-1530)
          - Yadgar (son of Qasim) (1530-1563)
          - Bekbulat (son of Qasim) - a possible co-ruler (1555-1558), a possible father of Simeon Bekbulatovich؟
            - Syed Ahmed Khan (1583 - 1588)
    - Abalak (Yabalak, Ebalak) - Mar's son
      - Angish (Agishev, Aguish) - Abalak's son

Musa Bies - a possible Khan of Sibir? (1460-1496).

- Munch-Timur: 1359
- Ali Bey Khan: 1359-1375
- Giyath-ud-din Kagan Bey: 1375-1396
- Tokhtamysh: 1396-1406
- Zhumaduk: 1406-1421
- Mahmud Khoja: 1421
- Khizr: 1421
- Kuchuk Muhammad Khan son Tokhtamysh: 1421-1428
- Abul-Khayr Khan: 1428-1464
- Ibaq Khan: 1464-1495
- Mamuq of Kazan: 1495-1502
- Kuluk Sultan: 1502-1530
- Jediger : 1552-1563
- Kuchum: 1563-1598
- Ali: 1598-1604

== Genealogies ==
=== Tay-Buqids ===
House of Tay-Buqa

Tyumen Khanate
Sibir Khanate

Tay-Buqa
Khwaja
Umar r. 1468–1480
Adil
Muhammad r. 1495–1502	Abulaq
Qasim r. 1516–1530	Yangish r. 1502–1516
Yadigar r. 1530–1563	Beg-Pulad r. 1530–1563

== Sources ==
- Russian Wikipedia (English translation: )
