= Chimgi-Tura =

Medieval city of the Siberian Tatars

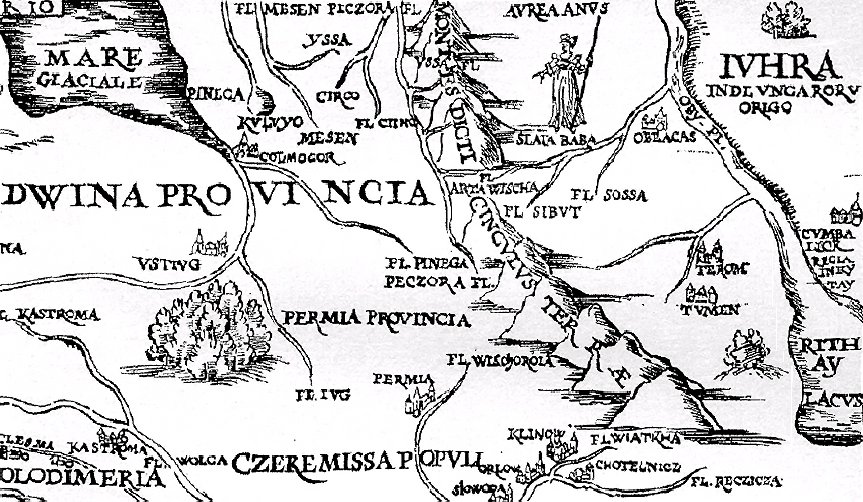
Tumen (Chimgi-Tura) on Sigismund von Herberstein's map, published in 1549

Chimgi-Tura or Chingi-Tura (Siberian Tatar: Цемкетора, Russian: Чинги-Тура) was a medieval city in the 12th to 16th centuries located in Western Siberia. After the Russian conquest, it was refounded as Tyumen.

== Name ==
The word “tura” (тора/tora) in Siberian Tatar means city or fortress.

== History ==
According to Russian historian Hadi Atlasi, Taibugha founded the settlement which was then named Chinkidin in honor of Genghis Khan. The settlement later evolved into Chimgi-Tura.

It was a capital of the Khanate of Sibir until the early 16th century, when its ruler Khan Muhammad decided not to remain at Chimgi-Tura, and chose a new capital named Qashliq located on the Irtysh.

After the Cossack ataman Yermak Timofeyevich conquered the Siberian Khanate in the 1580s, the city of Chimgi-Tura was abandoned or burned. In 1586, the Russian fort Tyumen was built nearby. Modern Tyumen, one of the centres of the Russian oil industry, covers the site where Chimgi-Tura used to stand.
