= Tarikh-i Abu al-Khayr Khani =

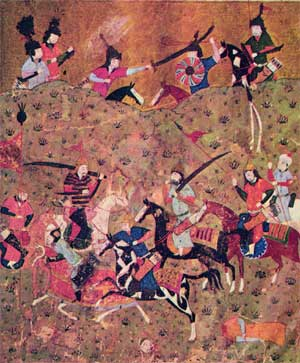
Artwork of the Battle of Dandanaqan. Derived from the manuscript: Tārīkh-i Abū’l-Khair Khānī (History of Abū al-Khair Khan). Beruni Institute in Tashkent ms. no. 9989. Manuscript written in Samarqand, 1543.

The Tarikh-i Abu al-Khayr Khani (Persian: اریخ ابوالخیر خانی) is a Persian universal history composed between 1540 and 1551 by Mas'udi ibn Usman Kuhistani under the Khanate of Bukhara. It has not been published, nor used a lot. The work starts with the creation of the world and the stories of pre-Islamic prophets, followed by the ancestors of Muhammad, his life, the early caliphs, and the Twelve Imams. It also chronicles the early rulers of Iran, from the Pishdadian ruler Keyumars to the Sasanian ruler Yazdegerd III. It then shifts to the periods of the Saffarid dynasty, Samanid Empire, Ghaznavids, Seljuk Empire, and Mongol Empire, and concludes with the story of Abu'l-Khayr Khan, the ruler of the Uzbek Khanate.

It is uncertain which sources Kuhistani had access to due to his life and career being obscure, and he did not cite any sources for his writings. Kuhistani's account of Kayumars has similar sentences to those of the Habib al-siyar by Khvandamir and the Shahnameh by Ferdowsi, which demonstrates he used those works.

== Sources ==
- Quinn, Sholeh A. (2020). Persian Historiography Across Empires: The Ottomans, Safavids, and Mughals. Cambridge University Press. ISBN 978-1108842211.
