= Battle of Chuvash Cape =

1582 Russian battle

Coordinates: 58°11′N 68°15′E

- Part of the Conquest of the Khanate of Sibir of Russian conquest of Siberia
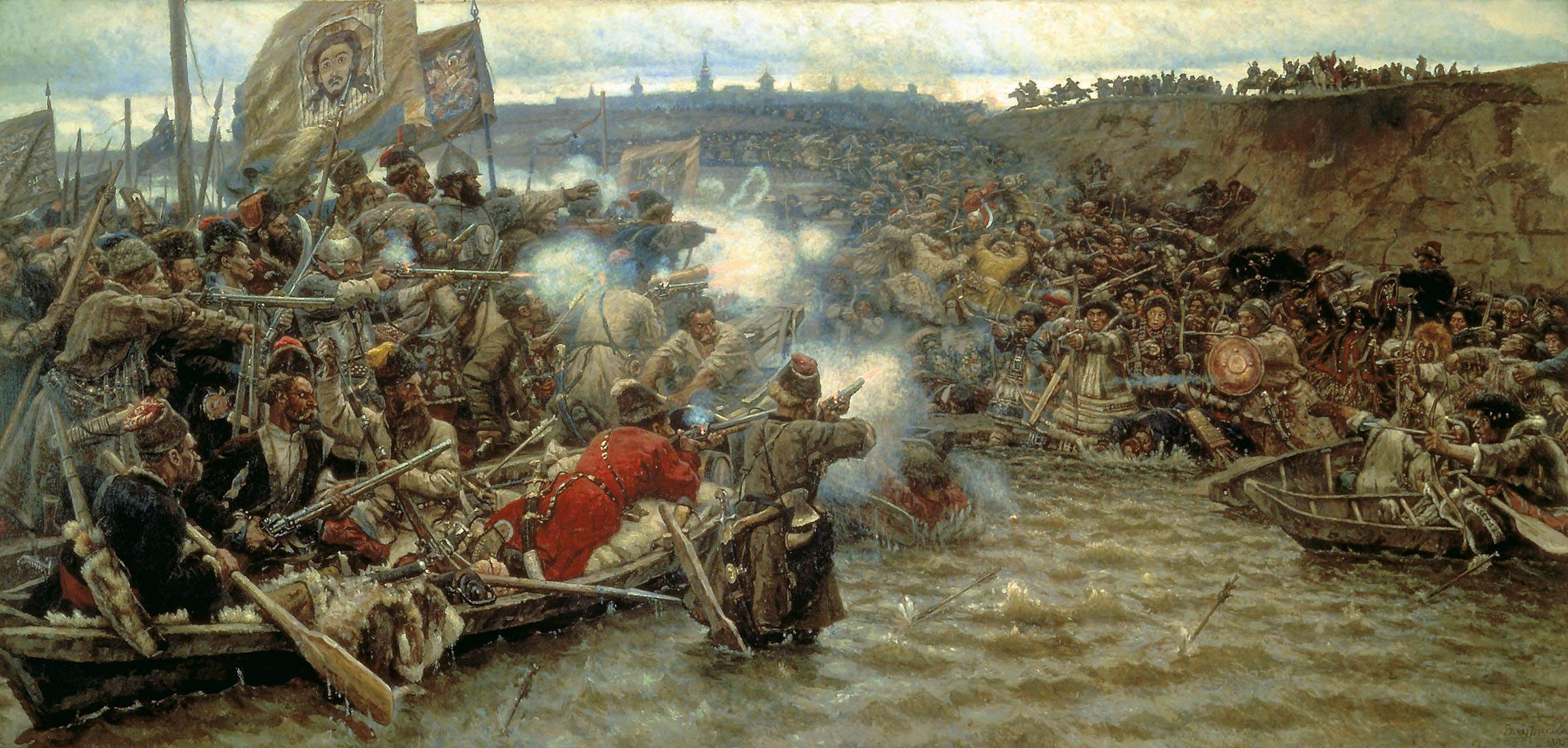
- The Conquest of Siberia by Vasily Surikov
Date	November 5 (O. S. October 26), 1582
Location	Chuvash Cape near Qashliq, Khanate of Sibir
Result	Russian victory

Belligerents
Tsardom of Russia	Khanate of Sibir

Commanders and leaders
(Tsardom of Russia) Yermak	(Khanate of Sibir) Mametqul

Units involved
Cossacks	Siberian irregulars Khanty and Mansi tribesmen Qashliq garrison

Strength
740	3,400

Casualties and losses
107 Casualties	2,800 Casualties

The Battle of Chuvash Cape (November 5 [O. S. October 26], 1582) led to the victory of a Russian expedition under Yermak Timofeyevich and the fall of Khanate of Sibir and the end of Khan Kuchum's power. The battle took place near Qashliq (Isker), in Siberia.

== Context ==
After Kuchum seized power in Sibir, he attacked the nearby lands of Perm. Merchant Stroganovs, who explored Ural deposits, requested the Cossacks to punish the Siberian Tatars. They equipped 540 men with arms and ammunition; later, 200 men joined the expedition.

== Qashliq fortifications ==
The fortifications of Qashliq before the battle were deteriorating. Because a siege would be fatal for the Tatars, they decided to fight at the river bank, and hide ambushing forces behind the numerous fallen trees in the area. Although Tatar cannons were brought into position, they did not fire during the battle.

== Battle ==
The Cossacks approached the bank, firing at the Siberians; the Siberians answered with arrows. However, Russian fire did not inflict many casualties among the Tatars, who hid among the trees.

The Siberians under Mametqul counter-attacked the Cossack expedition. The Cossacks positioned themselves in a square formation, and riflemen in the center opened fire. The Khanty and Mansi tribesmen who formed part of the Siberian ranks were mostly hunters; they had never participated in battles against soldiers equipped with firearms. Consequently, the tribesmen panicked and retreated. The rest of the Tatars proceeded with the offensive, but the Cossacks continued shooting, killing many Siberians. Mametqul was shot during the battle, and narrowly escaped capture; the Tatars evacuated him by boat.

After Mametqul was injured, the rest of the Siberian forces panicked and dispersed. Kuchum fled Qashliq, but the Cossacks chose not to pursue him. Instead, they retreated to Atik-town for the night.

== Aftermath ==
After the defeat, Kuchum and some of his subjugates escaped to the Baraba steppe; however, most locals refused to follow him. On October 26, the Cossacks entered Qashliq. The city was depopulated after the battle, although it was briefly repopulated from 1584 to 1586. After the battle, the Khanate of Sibir disintegrated, and most of its territory was annexed by Russia.

The conquest of Siberia is often compared with the Spanish conquest of the Americas. The conflict was provoked by individuals, as many conquistadors were, not states. Another notable popular belief is that the Siberians, like Native Americans, did not use fire-arms, leading to a Cossack victory. However, it is disputed.
