= The embassy sent by Shah Abbas to the Mughal court =

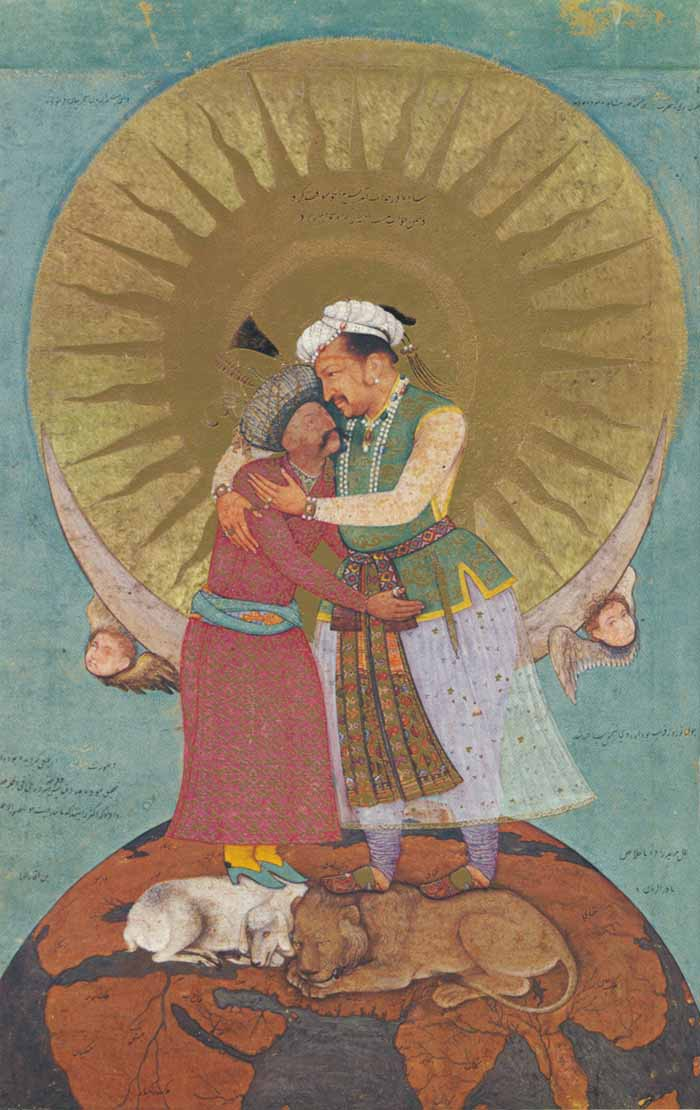
Abbas the Great and Jahangir

The embassy sent by Shah Abbas to the Mughal court — refers to the embassy sent by the Safavid Shah Abbas to the court of the Great Mughal Emperor Sultan Jahangir Shah in 1620. The main goal of the embassy was to ensure the annexation of Kandahar to the Safavid Empire.

== The reason ==
After Shah Abbas came to the throne, he defeated both the Uzbek Khanate and the Ottoman Empire and returned the lost lands. When he was still in the initial stage of his rule, the Mughals captured Kandahar. Kandahar was thought to be the main region waiting to be returned. In such circumstances, Jahangir Shah tried to solve the issue diplomatically. At this time, the first embassy was sent by the Mughals. The embassy was headed by the Mughal noble Khan Alam. Khan Alam was from the famous family and his great ancestors had been servants of Amir Teymur, a historical figure whom Abbas greatly admired and loved. The Spanish envoy Fiqueroa was also at Abbas's court at the time, and he reported that Khan Alam wore pearl earrings, carried a jeweled dagger, and was described by Indian merchants in Isfahan as incredibly rich. The Alam was accompanied by about 800 attendants and several hundred guards and an exotic collection of Indian fauna. Iskander Bey Turkman, who saw the arrival of the embassy in Isfahan with his own eyes, writes that the delegation was accompanied by 10 huge elephants equipped with gold tusks and decorated with all kinds of decorations, tigers, leopards, antelopes, cheetahs, rhinoceroses, talking birds and water buffaloes that collect various kinds of garbage. There were also various animals included. One of the members of the delegation was Bishan Das, the court painter of the Mughals. While he was in the Safavid Empire, he took some pictures and took them to Jahangir Shah. However, it was not possible to solve the Kandahar issue, which was the main goal of this embassy. Shah Abbas stubbornly demanded that Kandahar be returned to him and declared that he would not make any concessions. But for the last time, he decided to use diplomacy to solve the issue. It was also intended to respond to the embassy of Khan Alam. Zeynal Khan Shamli was elected as the leader. This issue was politely brought up again during the visit of Abbas's envoy Zeynal Bey to the Great Mughal Empire. Before that, Zeynal Bey was sent by Abbas to Europe as an ambassador, and in 1619 he was sent to the Mughal court together with Khan Alam. Iskander Bey Munshi Abbas chose Zeynal Bey because he had the necessary qualities as a messenger:

He possessed inner harmony, shrewdness, magnanimity, natural good manners and excellent communication skills. In addition, he was a man fully trusted by the Shah. In turn, Zeynal Bey, based on the devotion and loyalty expected of a Sufi, became the leader of the supreme spiritual leader (murshudu Kamilin) and was not hesitated to sacrifice his life or property in the service of his benefactor.

The embassy of Zeynal Bey was prepared as grandly as the embassy of Khan Alam, so that the power of the Safavid Empire would not be underestimated. But the embassy was not successful and the Mughals did not agree to return Kandahar. A few years later, Abbas attacked Kandahar and the Mughals were forced to accept it.
