= Yermak Monument =

Monument in Novocherkassk, Russia

Coordinates: 47.4144°N 40.1097°E

- Памятник Ермаку
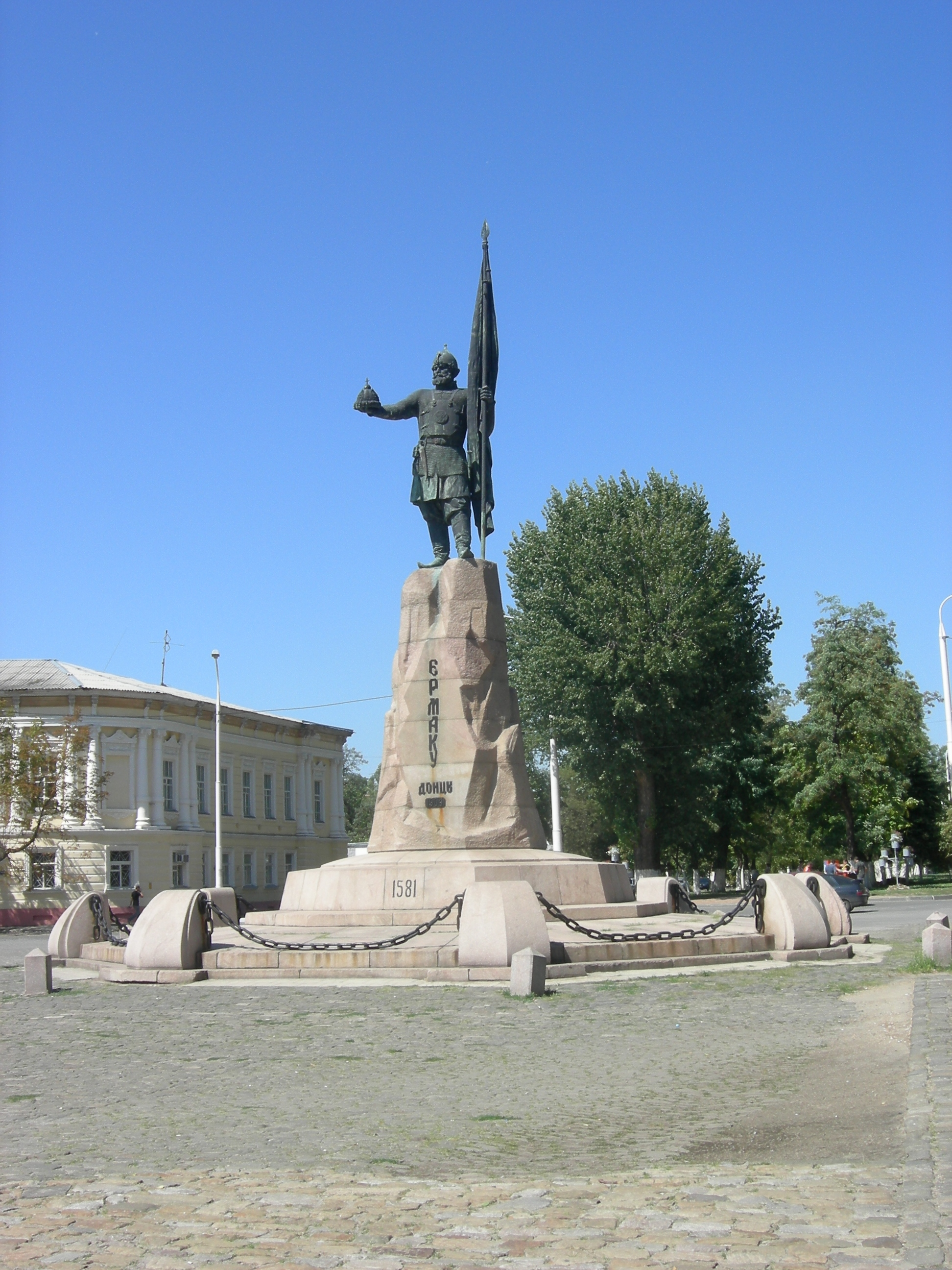
- Interactive map of Yermak Monument
- Location: Novocherkassk, Rostov Oblast, Russia
- Designer: Mikhail Mikeshin, Vladimir Beklemishev
- Material: bronze, granite
- Height: 4 metres (13 ft)
- Beginning date: 1903
- Completion date: 1904
- Opening date: 6 May 1904
- Dedicated to: Yermak

Yermak Monument in Novocherkassk (Russian: Памятник Ермаку в Новочеркасске) ― a sculptural work in honor of Yermak Timofeevich, a Cossack Ataman who began Russia's conquest of Siberia. The monument is considered to be an object of cultural heritage of federal importance.

== History ==
=== Work on project of the monument ===
1870 was the year of the 300th anniversary of Don Army. On 21 May, during the festivities held in Novocherkassk, the Cossacks, represented by the Chief of the Army Staff, Major-General Nikolai Leonov handed a memo to Alexander III (who was at that time the heir to the Russian throne) with a request of construction of a monument to the legendary conqueror of Siberia in Don Cossacks capital. In the same year the highest resolution on the satisfaction of the petition and a decree on the opening of a subscription to collect the necessary funds was issued. However, the subscription was delayed because of Russo-Turkish War of 1877–1878. Cash in the amount of 92,000 rubles had been being collected for 27 years, and the rest of the sum (about 40,000 rubles) the Cossack Army Administration donated from its treasury.

1889 saw the establishment of a special commission on construction of Yermak monument, with several philanthropists and state officials having taken part in it. In whole Russian Empire a competition for the best project of the monument was announced. Several projects had been considered.

The first project for the monument was designed by sculptor Mark Antokolsky in 1891, but this project was not approved. The project of the sculptor Mikhail Mikeshin, who also designed the monument "Millennium of Russia" in Novgorod (1862) was also not approved, because Yermak towered over the Two-headed eagle, the Tsar's emblem. The layout of this project is now on display in the Museum of the History of Don Cossacks.

Mikeshin proposed a new version of the monument to Yermak, which he drafted taking into account the official comments made. This project was adopted by the Commission in 1896, but in the same year Mikeshin died. The following years had brought Vladimir Beklemishev to work on the monument.

=== Construction ===
On 6 May 1903, at the Cathedral Square in Novocherkassk took place a ceremonial laying on the monument to Yermak. The place was consecrated and dwellers of Novocherkassk showered it with flowers.

On 6 May 1904, exactly one year after the date of foundation, the grand opening of the monument began. The procession with army regalia and battle flags passed from the Don Museum Square to the monument of Don Ataman. After the proclamation of the eternal memory of the conqueror of Siberia, the Army ataman Konstantin Maksimovich opened the curtain of the monument. Everyone who stood there for the first time saw the majestic image of Yermak clutching battle flag in one hand, and the crown of the conquered Siberia in second hand.

== Description of the monument ==
The 4-meter sculpture is mounted on a granite boulder. In his left hand Ermak holds a banner, and in the right hand the Siberian crown, which symbolizes the conquered lands of Siberia, which he presented to the Russian state. On the front side of the pedestal there is an inscription: "To Yermak 1904 from Don people 1581" (the year of the opening of the monument and the year of the beginning of the conquest of Sibir Khanate). On the back side of the pedestal there are inscribed words in gold: "to Don Ataman Yermak Timofeevich, the conqueror of Siberia, from a grateful posterity. In honor of the tercentenary of the Don. Rested in peace in the waves of the Irtysh on August 5, 1584." And here are also the words of Russian historian Nikolai Karamzin: "Russia, her history and Russian Church will always remember Yermak." The pedestal is surrounded by a massive chain on granite piers.
