= Abu'l-Khayr Khan =

Uzbek Khan from 1428 to 1468

Abu'l-Khayr
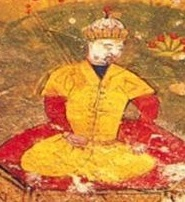
- Miniature of Abu'l Khayr Khan, 1460s

Khan of Shaybanids Khanate
- Reign: 1428‒1468
- Coronation: 1428
- Successor: Sheikh Haidar

Khan of Sibir
- Reign: 1428‒1468
- Coronation: 1428
- Predecessor: Muhammad Khan
- Successor: Ibak Khan
- Born: c. 1412; Blue Horde
- Died: 1468 (aged 55–56); Uzbek Khanate
- Spouse: Rabiya Sultan-Begim
- Issue: Muhammad Shaybani (grandson); Kuchkunji Khan (son); Suyunchkhodja Khan (son)
- House: Borjigin
- Dynasty: Shaybanid
- Religion: Islam

Abu'l-Khayr Khan (Turki/Kypchak and Persian: ابو الخیر خان; c. 1412 – 1468), also known as Bulgar Khan, (Note: According to the 17th-century source, Däftär-i Čingiz-nāmä, Abū’l-Khayr Khan is referred to as Bolɣar Khan.) was Khan of the Uzbek Khanate from 1428 to 1468, which united the nomadic Central Asian tribes.

He created one of the largest and most powerful Turkic states during the period of the 15th century. The Uzbek Khanate weakened in the decades following his death in 1468. He was succeeded by his son Sheikh Khaidar.

== Biography ==
Abu'l-Khayr was born around the year 1412. He was a descendant of Genghis Khan, through Jöchi's fifth son Shiban, and a bey/bek of the White Horde. Abu'l-Khayr and his family members loved literature and ordered translation of some from Persian to Turkic. At the time of his birth the ulus of Shiban had divided into separate nomadic groups, one of which was led by Jumaduq Khan. Abu'l-Khayr served in Jumaduq's army, and was taken prisoner when Jumaduq was killed in battle in 1427.

After being released in 1428, Abu'l-Khayr began consolidating various nomadic groups of the old Shaybani ulus in the area around Tyumen and the Tura River. He deposed and killed Kazhy Mohammed, the Khan of the Khanate of Sibir, after a battle on the Tobol River, after which he was proclaimed Khan of Western Siberia. The next four years were spent strengthening his control throughout the region.

Abu'l-Khayr Khan was assisted in his consolidation by the Manghits, another tribe in the White Horde, and especially by Vaqqāṣ Bej, Edigü's grandson.

In 1430–1431 Abu'l-Khayr, joined by Vaqqāṣ, launched on attack on Khwarezm, occupying the regional capital Urganj. The Uzbeks could not hold the city, however, and retreated in the summer of 1431. Abu'l-Khayr's army pulled back to the steppe, where they defeated two opposing khans near Astrakhan. In 1435–1436 the Uzbek armies attacked Khwarezm again, and several years later they raided Astrakhan. Starting in 1446 Abu'l-Khayr and his forces invaded the Syr Darya region, eventually wresting some lands from Timurid control. The town of Sighnaq became Abu'l-Khayr's new capital, from where he later launched raids into Mawarannahr (Transoxiana).

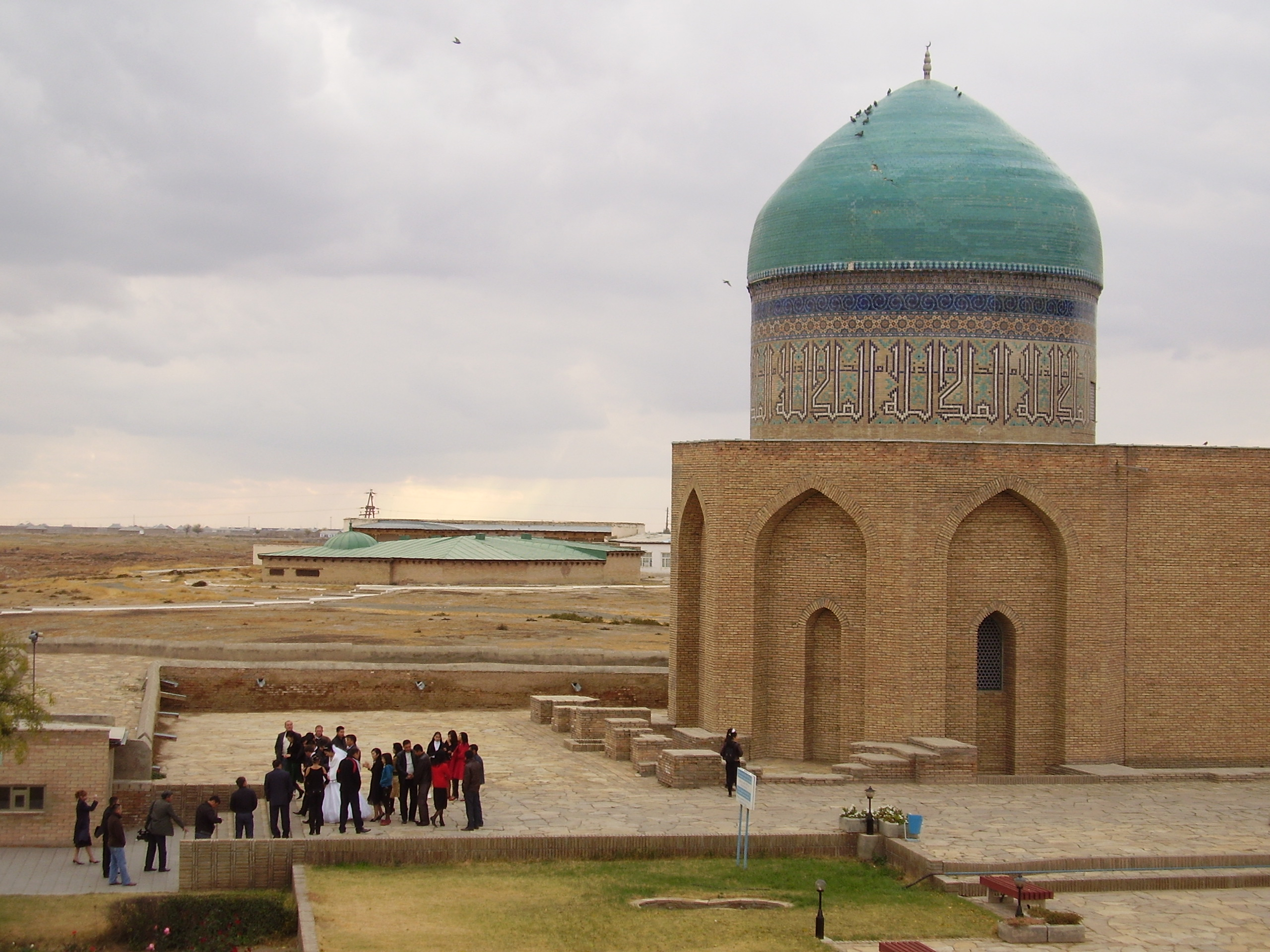
Mausoleum of Rabiya Sultan Begim, wife of Abu'l-Khayr, in Turkistan

In 1451 Abu Sa'id requested Abu'l-Khayr Khan's assistance in battle against 'Abdullah. Abu'l-Khayr agreed to support Abu Sa'id, and the two armies marched on Samarkand. 'Abdullah was defeated and killed, after which Abu Sa'id quickly moved his forces into the city and locked the gates, leaving Abu'l-Khayr and the Uzbeks outside. To avoid reprisal, Abu Sa'id presented the Uzbeks with many presents and riches. In 1451 Abulkhair helped the Timurid Abu Said to come to power. In Samarkand, he married the daughter of the Sultan of Maverannahr, the astronomer and astrologer Ulugbek. Ulugbek's daughter Rabiya Sultan-Begim became the mother of his sons Kuchkunji Khan and Suyunchkhodja Khan, who later ruled Maverannahr. Rabiya Sultan-Begim died in 1485 and was buried in the city of Turkistan.

In 1452, the sultans Kerei and Janibek, descendants of Urus Khan, separated from Abu'l-Khayr's authority along with groups of nomadic tribes and migrated to Moghulistan. Esen Buqa Khan of Moghulistan welcomed them and granted them lands in the western part of his territory, near the Chu River. Their movement became an important stage in the formation of the Kazakh Khanate.

In 1468, Abu'l-Khayr Khan launched a military campaign against the groups led by Kerei and Janibek but died before reaching them. Following his death, his state disintegrated, and many of his former followers joined the Kazakh rulers.

Abu'l-Khayr Khan died in 1468 (though some sources say 1469 or 1470). After Abu'l-Khayr Khan's death two separate lines of descent controlled the twin Uzbek states of Mawara al-Nahr and Khwarezm. In the first decade of the 16th century his grandson Muhammad Shaybani finally succeeded in the unification of the Uzbeks and established the short-lived Shaybanid Empire, centered in Samarkand.

== See also ==
- Shaybanids
- List of Sibir khans

== Notes ==
Abu'l-Khayr Khan Shaybanid Dynasty
Preceded by	Khan of Uzbeks; 1428–1468	Succeeded by Haider Sultan
