= House of Siberia =

Russian noble family

The House of Sibirsky (Russian: Сибирский, pl. Сибирские) was the foremost of many Genghisid (Shaybanid) families formerly living in Russia. It traced its descent from Kuchum, the last of the Siberian khans.

== History ==
Kuchum's sons were captured by Yermak's Cossacks and brought to Muscovy, where they were settled in Yaroslavl and other towns and were authorized to style themselves Tsarevichs of Siberia (Russian: царевичи Сибирские). Kuchum's grandson Alp-Arslan was even installed as a puppet khan of Kasimov between 1614 and 1627.

In 1591, the son of Kuchum, Abul Khayir was the first of his dynasty to convert to Christianity. His conversion was followed by the conversion of his entire family who eventually assimilated into the Russian nobility. For instance, although his son was known as Vasily Abulgairovich, his grandson's name, Roman Vasilyevich, could no longer be distinguished from a native Russian name.

In 1686, the tsar decreed that the dynasties of the king of Imeretia in the Caucasus along with the princes of Siberia and Kasimov were to be entered into the Genealogical Book of the Russian nobility. Originally, their legal standing was similar to that of the mediatized princes of the Holy Roman Empire. The tsarevichs married into the best Russian families. One of their princesses was the wife of Peter the Great's maternal uncle, another married a son of the Georgian king.

== Notable representatives ==
The last of tsarevichs was Vasily Alekseyevich Sibirsky, who apparently sided with Tsarevich Alexis against Peter the Great. In 1718, he was banished to Siberia, while the title of his descendants was degraded from tsarevich to kniaz, or prince.

Vasily's grandson, Prince Vasily Fyodorovich Sibirsky, reached a high rank of General of Infantry in the service of Catherine the Great but was implicated in irregularities and sent to Siberia by her son, Paul I. Alexander I returned him to St Petersburg as a senator. His son Alexander was also a tsarist general.

The latter's son, Prince Alexander Alexandrovich Sibirsky (1824–79) was the last recorded member of the Sibirsky family. He was prepared by his parents for military service and saw action in the Crimean War. At that time, he became interested in the Greek colonies in Crimea and South Russia and produced a remarkable monograph on the medals and coins of the Bosporan Kingdom. The whole edition perished during an inundation, with only three copies left today. Nevertheless, Sibirsky's work was awarded the Demidov Prize for 1859. Upon Sibirsky's death, his superb collection of ancient coins devolved upon the Grand Duke Alexander Mikhailovich of Russia.
