= Qarachi =

Turkic borrowed word from Mongolian

Qarachi (Tatar: Qaraçı) (sometimes spelled Kharachi), or Qarachu (Mongolian: ᠬᠠᠷᠠᠴᠤ), was the highest level of nobles (beys) within Mongol and Turkic khanates of the 12th through 16th centuries. In Mongol Empire, its Mongolian variant Qarachu begs or Qarachu noyan was used to denote military commanders and members of the keshig, who were not descended from the imperial family of Chinggis Khan. In the successor states of the Mongol Empire like the Siberia Khanate and Kazan Khanate, the name could be applied to the member of the four extended families: Shirin (Şirin), Barghen (Barğın), Arghen (Arğın), Qepchaq (Qıpçaq). These four were the leading non-royal clans of the Crimean Khanate.

In the Mongolian context, the origins of the qarachi begs (qarachu noyans) can be traced to the elders of the royal bodyguard, whose position was not necessarily tied to any particular tribe or clan and was initially non-hereditary. In modern Mongolian language, Kharats (Qarats), or Kharatsu, still refers to a commoner who is not a member of the ruling elite and aristocracy.

The Qarachi beys acted as councillors and advised the Khan at court. They exercised particular influence during the reigns of Jochi and then later in the Crimean Khanate. Historian Christopher P. Atwood suggests that this institution was borrowed from the Great Khan Qubilai's reform for his keshig in the late 13th century.
