= Uzbek Khanate =

1428–1471 Shaybanid state preceding the Khanate of Bukhara

- 1428–1471
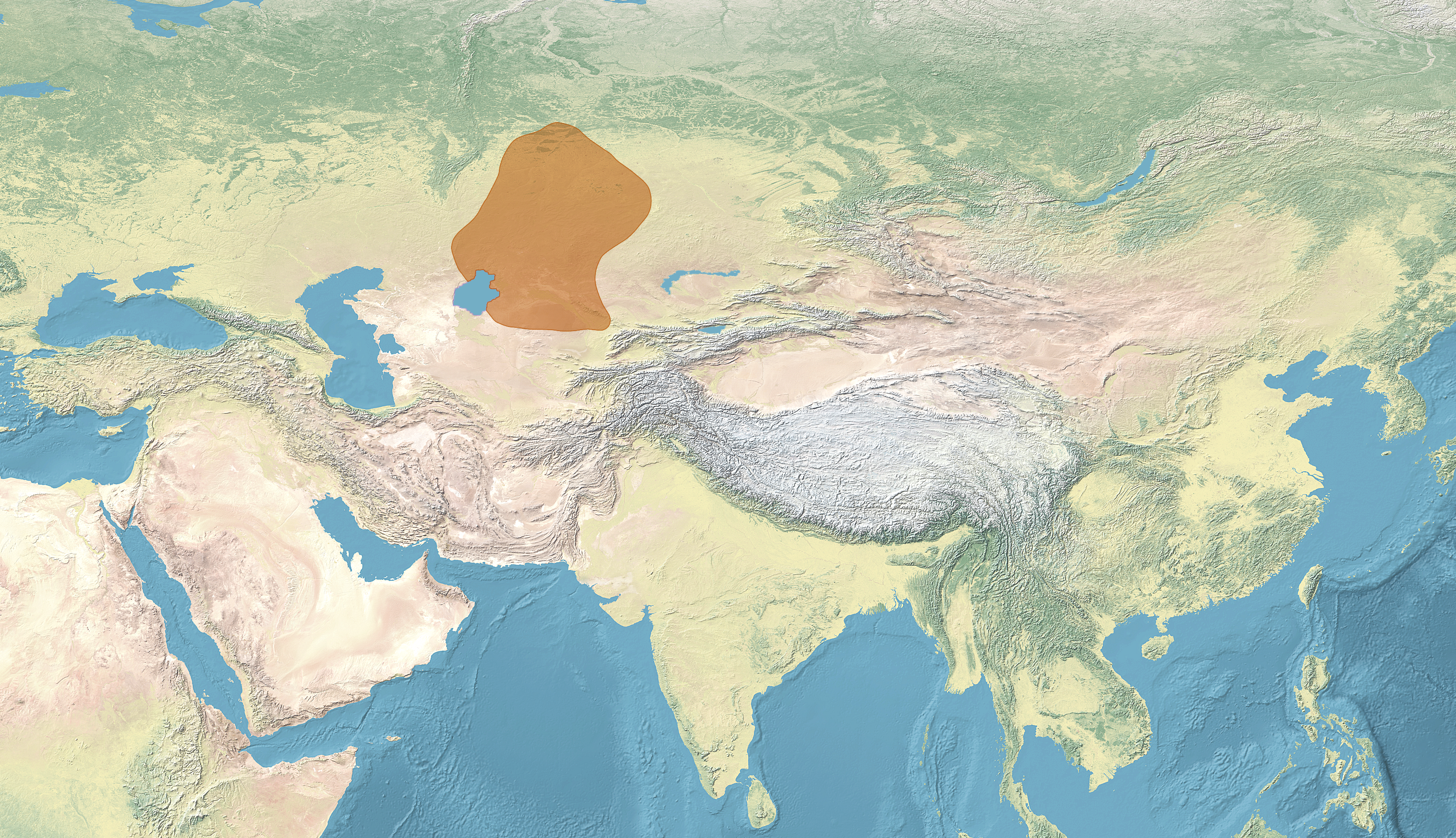
- The Uzbek Khanate in c. 1448
- Capital: Chimgi-Tura (1428–1446); Sighnaq (1446–1469); Iasy (1469–1471)
- Common languages: Kipchak language Persian (court)
- Religion: Islam (Sunni); Naqshbandi Sufism
- Government: Hereditary monarchy
- Khan
  - 1428–1468: Abu'l-Khayr Khan
  - 1468–1471: Sheikh Haidar
- Historical era: Early modern period
  - Abu'l-Khayr becomes the Uzbek Khan: 1428
  - Abu'l-Khayr defeats Hajji Muhammad: 1428
  - Shaybanids invade Transoxiana: 1446
  - Janibeg and Kerei found the Kazakh Khanate: 1466
  - Death of Abu'l-Khayr: 1468
  - Disestablished: 1471
Preceded by
Golden Horde
Blue Horde
Succeeded by
Kazakh Khanate
Nogai Horde
Khanate of Sibir

The Uzbek Khanate, also called the Abu'l-Khayrid Khanate (or Abulkhair Khanate) or the Shibanid Khanate, was a state formed as a result of the collapse of the Golden Horde and the nomadic grounds of the Blue Horde of the Ulus of Jochi, united in the 15th century by Khan Abu'l-Khayr and located to the north of the Timurid Empire. It is classified as an incipient state.

== Etymology ==
The dynasty of Abu'l-Khayr Khan and his descendants is named after him, and the states ruled by them are known as Abu'l-Khayrids, such as in the Khanate of Bukhara. They may also be referred to as Shaybanids, although this is more of an umbrella term as a rival dynasty called the Arabshahids of Khwarazm were also Shaybanids, but not Abu'l-Khayrids.

Originally, the ethnonym "Uzbek" was not used as a self-designation for a distinct ethnic group in the eastern part of the Ulus of Jochi. In fact, there was no separate ethnic group with this name at that time. The territory of the Golden Horde was inhabited by nomadic tribes, which were usually referred to as "Tatars" in Arabic, Russian, and European sources, and as "Uzbeks" in Central Asian sources. In the early period, the term "Uzbeks" was used in Central Asia to refer to the entire nomadic population of the Ulus of Jochi. After the campaigns of Muhammad Shaybani in the region, the meaning of this name became more restricted and came to denote mainly the descendants of the specific group of nomads who resettled in Central Asia along with the Shaybanids. Thus, it can be said that there was no separate ethnic group of "nomadic Uzbeks" in the Ulus of Jochi; rather, there was a unified nomadic Golden Horde people, known in Europe as "Tatars" and in Central Asia as "Uzbeks".

A similar position is held by the Kazakh historian K. Z. Uskembay. According to him, in Timurid sources the nomadic population of Ak Orda is designated by the term "Uzbeks". The historian notes that this tradition became so entrenched in Central Asian historiography that later, during the reign of Barak Khan and the Shibanid Abulkhair Khan, their subjects and even the state continued to be called by this term. A similar conclusion is also reached by the Kazakh historian Zh. M. Sabitov, who considers the term "Uzbek" as a Central Asian exo-ethnonym (an external name) applied to the nomadic population of the entire Ulus of Jochi. According to the historian, the term "nomadic Uzbeks" was coined in 1965 by B. A. Akhmedov and is not mentioned in the sources.

== History ==
=== Before Abu'l-Khayr Khan ===
Starting with Shiban, brother of Batu Khan who was the ruler of the Golden Horde, the Shaybanids and their descendants held land and sway over many tribes granted to Shiban by Batu. These lands included the Golden Horde domains east of the Urals, and lands north of the Syr Darya river. Central control in the Golden Horde eroded away quickly in the east and breakaway states like the Nogai Horde and the Khanate of Sibir appeared in the region.

=== Abu'l-Khayr Khan ===
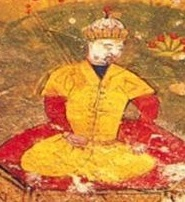
Abu'l-Khayr Khan

By the time of Abu'l-Khayr's birth in 1412, the ulus of Shiban was fractured. At this time the eastern part of the Golden Horde (White Horde) had become outside of complete control of the Golden Horde khans and pretenders, especially after the assassination of Barak Khan in 1427. Abu'l-Khayr was taken prisoner after a battle in 1427 and was released in 1428. After the passing of the then Khan of the Uzbeks and pretender to the throne of the Golden Horde, Barak Khan, Ulug Beg, the leader of the Timurid Empire, secretly orchestrated the title of khan to pass to Abu'l-Khayr. He began his rule by consolidating tribes in Siberia around his capital at Chimgi-Tura (Modern-day Tyumen). He was able to depose the reigning Khan of Sibir, Hajji Muhammad, a former khan of the Golden Horde from 1419 to 1423, and took the entirety of the area under Shaybanid control.

In 1430 or 1431, Abu'l-Khayr and his army marched south into Timurid-held Khwarazm and occupied Urganj. Between 1430 and 1446 the Uzbek Khanate took land in Transoxiana from the Timurids.

Abu'l-Khayr invaded the Golden Horde sometime after this and defeated Mustafa Khan near Astrakhan. The Uzbeks lost around 4,500 men during this campaign.

Prior to the death of Shah Rukh in 1448 Sighnaq and other cities in Turan such as Uzkend and Sozak were invaded and captured by the Uzbeks. Sighnaq became one of the principal cities of Central Asia during this time.

In 1451, Abu'l-Khayr allied with the Timurid Abu Sa'id against his rival 'Abdullah and the two both marched on Samarkand. The Uzbek-Abu Sa'id alliance was successful and in return Abu Sa'id paid tribute to the Uzbeks.

=== The struggle for Eastern Desht-i Kipchak ===
Starting in the 1460s, the Kazakh khans warred for control of modern-day Kazakhstan, led by Janibeg and Kerei Khan, the sons of the claimant to the throne of the Golden Horde, Barak Khan, founded the Kazakh Khanate. This war was made especially difficult for the Uzbeks because of a recent war with the Oirats on the Uzbeks' eastern borders. Janibeg and Kerei sought to capitalize on Abu'l-Khayr's weakness following the conflict.

Regarding these events, 16th-century general Haidar Dughlat in his Tarikh-i Rashidi reports:

At that time, Abulkhair Khan exercised full power in Dasht-i-Kipchak. He had been at war with the Sultánis of Juji; while Jáni Beg Khán and Karáy Khán fled before him into Moghulistán. Isán Bughá Khán received them with great honor, and delivered over to them Kuzi Báshi, which is near Chu, on the western limit of Moghulistán, where they dwelt in peace and content. On the death of Abulkhair Khán the Ulus of the Uzbegs fell into confusion, and constant strife arose among them. Most of them joined the party of Karáy Khán and Jáni Beg Khán. They numbered about 200,000 persons, and received the name of Uzbeg-Kazák. The Kazák Sultáns began to reign in the year 870 [1465–1466] (but God knows best), and they continued to enjoy absolute power in the greater part of Uzbegistán, till the year 940 [1533–1534 A. D.].

=== Death of Abu'l-Khayr Khan and successors ===
Somewhere around 1468–1470, Abu'l-Khayr Khan died in battle against the Kazakhs along with several of his sons. Sheikh Haidar, also known as Baruj Oghlan (some sources have them as the same person or different persons), the eldest of Abu'l-Khayr's sons, succeeded him. Sheikh Haidar's reign was short and was ended after conflicts with a rival khan, Ibak.

Muhammad Shaybani, Abu'l-Khayr's grandson, succeeded his father, Sheikh Haidar. Shaybani had been, along with his brother, Mahmud Sultan, given refuge by the Khan of Astrakhan, Qasim.

After Shaybani was helped by the Moghul Khans to reclaim land in Transoxiana, he became a Moghul vassal from 1488 until around 1500. After this point, Shaybani led his own conquests which largely consisted of cities in the fractured Timurid successor states (Such as Samarkand and Bukhara). Shaybani's main rivals were the Timurid Babur and the Persian Shah Ismail I.

In 1500, Shaybani officially conceded all the Kazakh-held lands in Dasht-i Qipchaq to the Kazakh Khanate. Shortly after this in 1506, Shaybani captured Bukhara and the Uzbek Khanate became the Khanate of Bukhara.

Muhammad Shaybani was killed in the Battle of Marv by the Safavids ruled by Ismail I in 1510, and had his skull turned into a jeweled drinking goblet.

== Scholarly criticism ==
In 1428, Abulkhair Khan was proclaimed the ruler of a new political union of the Uzbeks, which in historical science is often referred to as the "Khanate of Abulkhair" or the "State of the Nomadic Uzbeks". However, the term "State of the Nomadic Uzbeks" introduced by academician B. A. Akhmedov, has been criticized by Ilya Zaytsev, who considers it not entirely appropriate.

Some Kazakhstani historians, in particular A. K. Kushkumbaev and Zh. M. Sabitov, believe that the use in modern historiography of such terms as "State of the Nomadic Uzbeks", "Uzbek Khanate", or "Khanate of the Nomadic Uzbeks" does not reflect the real picture of the Eastern Ulus of Jochi. These terms were first introduced into scholarly circulation in the 1960s by the Soviet historian B. A. Akhmedov in the context of nation-building in Soviet Uzbekistan and are not based on the sources of that era. Historians also note that Abulkhair Khan was one of the khans of the Golden Horde who continued its political tradition, and not the founder of a new state called the "State of the Nomadic Uzbeks".

== Rulers ==
=== Khans of Shaybanid Domains ===
These are the khans ruling over the domains of the Uzbeks prior to the Abu'l-Khayrids.

- Shiban
- Bahadur Oghul
- Jochi Buqa
- Bad Oghul
- Mengu Timur Oghlan
- Fulad Oghul
- Ibrahim Sultan
- Dawlat Shaykh Oghlan

=== Abu'l-Khayrids ===
- Abu'l-Khayr Khan, son of Dawlat Shaykh Oghlan
- Sheikh Haidar, son of Abu'l-Khayr, died in battle in 1471 against Ibak Khan
- Muhammad Shaybani, grandson of Abu'l-Khayr Khan

== Sources ==
- Welsford, Thomas (2025). Mongols, Tatars, and Turks in the Persianate World.
