= Däftär-i Čingiz-nāmä =

The Däftär-i Čingiz-nāmä is an anonymously written chronicle of Volga Tatar oral stories. Composed in the late 17th century, though not based on historical fact, it gives insight into the qazaq way of life. It was later edited and published by Mirkasym Abdulakhatovich Usmanov and M. Ivanics

== Mongol genealogy ==
Anonymously written in the late 17th century, the Däftär-i Čingiz-nāmä is not an historical document, but a chronicle of Volga Tatar oral legends.

The Däftär-i Čingiz-nāmä gives an indepth look at the ancestry of Genghis Khan, while illustrating a narrative legend of the fictitious "qazaq" life of Temur and Genghis Khan. In the Däftär, Chinggis is depicted as the son of Alan Qo’a, who conceived him after her late husband, Duyin Bayan, returned in the form of a beam of light. While these accounts are not grounded in historical facts, they provide insight into the modern understanding of the Qazaq way of life. Among the Volga Tatars to become a "qazaq"(qazaq čïq) was an expression meaning to leave one's home and become a wandering warrior, outcast, or runaway.

The Däftär-i Čingiz-nāmä's account of the founding of Kazan, could be the basis for Timur's legendary conquest of Bulghar. Additionally, legends about Timur's destruction of Bulghar are also found in Tatar historical songs. Usmanov concluded that the Däftär-i Čingiz-nāmä and the Tawarikh-i Bulghariyya present important variations in their portrayals of Timur, which are particularly important since the Däftär served as the primary source for the Tawarikh-i.

The Däftär does not use the term Turk to describe the groups in which Genghis and Temur originated.

== Modern version ==
Dilyara Usmanova, professor of History at Kazan Federal University, states the Däftär is among the most significant works of the Volga region's literary history. Mirkasym Abdulakhatovich Usmanov and M. Ivanics edited and published the Däftär-i Čingiz-nāmä in 2002. According to Jen Wilkens, professor of Turkish and Central Asian Studies, the Däftär represents the influence of Mongolian traditions in Turkic epic literature.

== Sources ==
- Frank, Allen J. (1998). Islamic Historiography and 'Bulghar' Identity Among the Tatars and Bashkirs of Russia. Brill.
- Lee, Joo-Yup (2016). "The Historical Meaning of the Term Turk and the Nature of the Turkic Identity of the Chinggisid and Timurid Elites in Post-Mongol Central Asia". Central Asiatic Journal. 59 (1–2, Migration and Nation-Building in Central and Western Asia: Turkic Peoples and Their Neighbours (I)): 101–132.
- Lee, Joo-Yup (2016a). Qazaqlïq, or Ambitious Brigandage, and the Formation of the Qazaqs. Brill.
- Lee, Joo-Yup (2017). "The Political Vagabondage of the Chinggisid and Timurid Contenders to the Throne and Others in Post-Mongol Central Asia and the Qipchaq Steppe: A Comprehensive Study of Qazaqlïq, or the Qazaq Way of Life". Central Asiatic Journal. 60 (1–2, Migration and Nation-Building in Central and Western Asia: Turkic Peoples and Their Neighbours (II)): 59–95.
- Усманова, Диляра (2006). Источники и исследования по истории татарского народа: материалы к учебным курсам [Sources and research on the history of the Tatar people: materials for training courses] (in Russian). Казанский гос. университет.
- Vásáry, István (2009). "The Beginnings of Coinage in the Blue Horde". Acta Orientalia Academiae Scientiarum Hungaricae. 62, No. 4 (December). Akadémiai Kiadó: 371–385.
- Wilkens, Jens (2020). "Reviewed Work: The 'Pagan' Oγuz-nāmä. A Philological and Linguistic Analysis. (Turcologica 113) by Balázs Danka". Wiener Zeitschrift für die Kunde des Morgenlandes (in German). 110: 388–392.
