= Taibuga =

First Khan of Sibir

Taibuga (Siberian Tatar: Тайбоға), the first khan of the Khanate of Sibir, came to power in the 13th century as a result of the power vacuum caused by the breakup of the Mongol Empire. Some legendary accounts identify him as a noble from Bukhara and associate him with the conversion of Sibir to Islam.

The facts of his reign remain relatively unclear, but it appears he was a shamanist. Taibuga drove the forces of Novgorod from his land. He was claimed as the founding ancestor by the Taibuga clan of Sibir.
