= Yermak Timofeyevich =

Russian cossack explorer and pirate

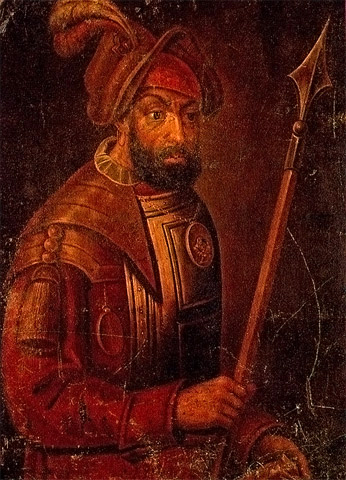
- 17th-century portrait of Yermak, the first Russian leader of the exploration and conquest of Siberia
- Born: c. 1532; Along Chusovaya River, Northern Dvina river, Kama River or Don River, Grand Principality of Moscow
- Died: 5 or 6 August 1585 (aged about 53); Sibiryak, Qashliq, Khanate of Sibir
- Occupations: Soldier; Explorer; Porter; Sailor; River pirate
- Known for: Cossack who led the Russian exploration and conquest of Siberia, in the reign of Tsar Ivan the Terrible

Yermak Timofeyevich (Russian: Ермак Тимофеевич, IPA: [jɪrˈmak tʲɪmɐˈfʲejɪvʲɪt͡ɕ]; c. 1532 – 5 or 6 August 1585) was a Cossack ataman, a zemleprokhodets, who started the Russian conquest of Siberia during the reign of the Russian Tsar Ivan the Terrible. He is today a hero in Russian folklore and myths.

Russian interests in the fur trade fueled their desire to expand east into Siberia. The Tatar Khanate of Kazan established by Ulugh Muhammad was the best entryway into Siberia. In 1552, Ivan the Terrible's modernized army toppled the khanate. After the takeover of Kazan, the tsar looked to the powerful and affluent Stroganov merchant family to spearhead the eastward expansion. In the late 1570s, the Stroganovs recruited Cossack fighters to invade Asia on behalf of the tsar. These Cossacks elected Yermak as the leader of their armed forces, and in 1582 Yermak set out with an army of 840 to attack the Khanate of Sibir.

On October 26, 1582, Yermak and his soldiers overthrew Kuchum Khan's Tatar empire at Qashliq in a battle that marked the "conquest of Siberia". Yermak remained in Siberia and continued his struggle against the Tatars until 1584, when a raid organized by Kuchum Khan ambushed and killed him and his party.

The specifics of Yermak's life, such as his appearance, background, and dates of events, remain points of controversy for historians, because the texts that document his life are not reliable. However, his life and conquests had a profound influence on Siberian relations, sparking Russian interest in the region and establishing the Tsardom of Russia as an imperial power east of the Urals.

== Authenticity ==
There is less information about Yermak than most other notable explorers and historical figures. Much of what we know about Yermak is derived from folklore and legend. There are no contemporary descriptions of Yermak and all portraits are merely estimations. One of the Siberian chronicles, the Remezov Chronicle, written more than one hundred years after Yermak's death describes him as "flat-faced, black of beard with curly hair, of medium stature and thick-set and broad-shouldered," but even this detailed account is not reliable because the narrator had never seen Yermak.

In addition to his physical features' being unknown, the details of Yermak's life and the circumstances leading up to his excursion into Siberia are obscure. Russian writer Valentin Rasputin laments the lack of information that we have about Yermak considering the vast scope of his contributions to Russia's historical destiny.

Knowledge of Yermak's upbringing and voyages pales in comparison to that of other explorers. Historians encounter serious difficulties when attempting to piece together the specifics of Yermak's life and exploits because the two key, primary sources about Yermak may be biased or inaccurate. These sources are the Stroganov Chronicle and the Sinodnik. The Stroganov Chronicle was commissioned by the Stroganov family itself, therefore it exaggerates the family's involvement in the conquest of Siberia. The Sinodnik is an account of Yermak's campaign written forty years after his death by the archbishop of Tobolsk, Cyprian (Kipriyan). The text was formed based on oral tradition and memories of his expedition but almost certainly was affected by the archbishop's desire to canonize Yermak. The combination of forgotten details over time and the embellishment or omission of facts in order for Yermak to be accepted as a saint suggests that the Sinodik could be erroneous. Though Cyprian failed to canonize Yermak, he made an effort to immortalize the warrior, who he considered being the "Grand Inquisitor" of Siberia.

These documents, along with the various others that chronicle Yermak's expeditions, are filled with contradictions that make the truth about Yermak's life difficult to discern. While the sources that exist on Yermak are fallible, those accounts, along with folklore and legend, are all that historians have to base their knowledge on; therefore, they are widely accepted and considered to reflect the truth.

== Early life ==
=== Ancestry ===
The Don Cossack warrior Yermak Timofeyevich was born by the Chusovaya River on the eastern fringes of the Muscovite lands. The only information about Yermak's upbringing comes from a source called the Cherepanov Chronicle. This chronicle, compiled by a Tobolsk coachman in 1760 – long after Yermak's death – was never published in full, but, in 1894, historian Aleksandr Alekseyevich Dmitriyev concluded it probably represents a copy or paraphrase of an authentic 17th-century document. According to the section of the chronicle entitled "On Yermak, and where he was born", it is stated that Yermak's grandfather, Afonasiy Grigoryevich Alenin, came from Suzdal, north-east of Moscow.

To escape poverty, he moved south to Vladimir where he became a coachman in the Murom forests. In the Murom forests, the voyevoda arrested him for driving unscrupulous passengers – robbers who had hired him. Afonasiy's son (Yermak's father) Timofey relocated to the Stroganov lands on the Chusovaya in order to make money.

=== Occupation ===
Yermak worked in the Stroganovs' river fleet as a porter and a sailor transporting salt along the Kama and the Volga rivers. Growing tired of his work, he assembled a gang, left his employment, and moved to the Don region to become a river pirate. Among his fellow Cossack bandits, he acquired the nickname Yermak.

Prior to his conquest of Siberia, Yermak's combat experience consisted of leading a Cossack detachment for the tsar in the Livonian War of 1558–83 and plundering merchant ships. Based on legends and folk songs, for years, Yermak had been involved in robbing and plundering on the Volga with the hetman Ivan Kolzo and four other Cossack leaders. Historian Valerie Kivelson refers to Yermak's group as "his gang of thugs." Like many other Cossacks, Yermak's gang was involved in the "thieves" trade ("vorovskim" remeslom). It was typical of Cossacks to engage in piracy on the Sea of Azov or the Caspian Sea and to rob various envoys and Russian or Persian merchants. Though a bandit, Yermak earned a reputation as an eminent and loyal Russian fighter. Through his experience fighting in the Livonian War, he learned war tactics and excelled beyond the other hetmans in skill.

== Conquest background ==
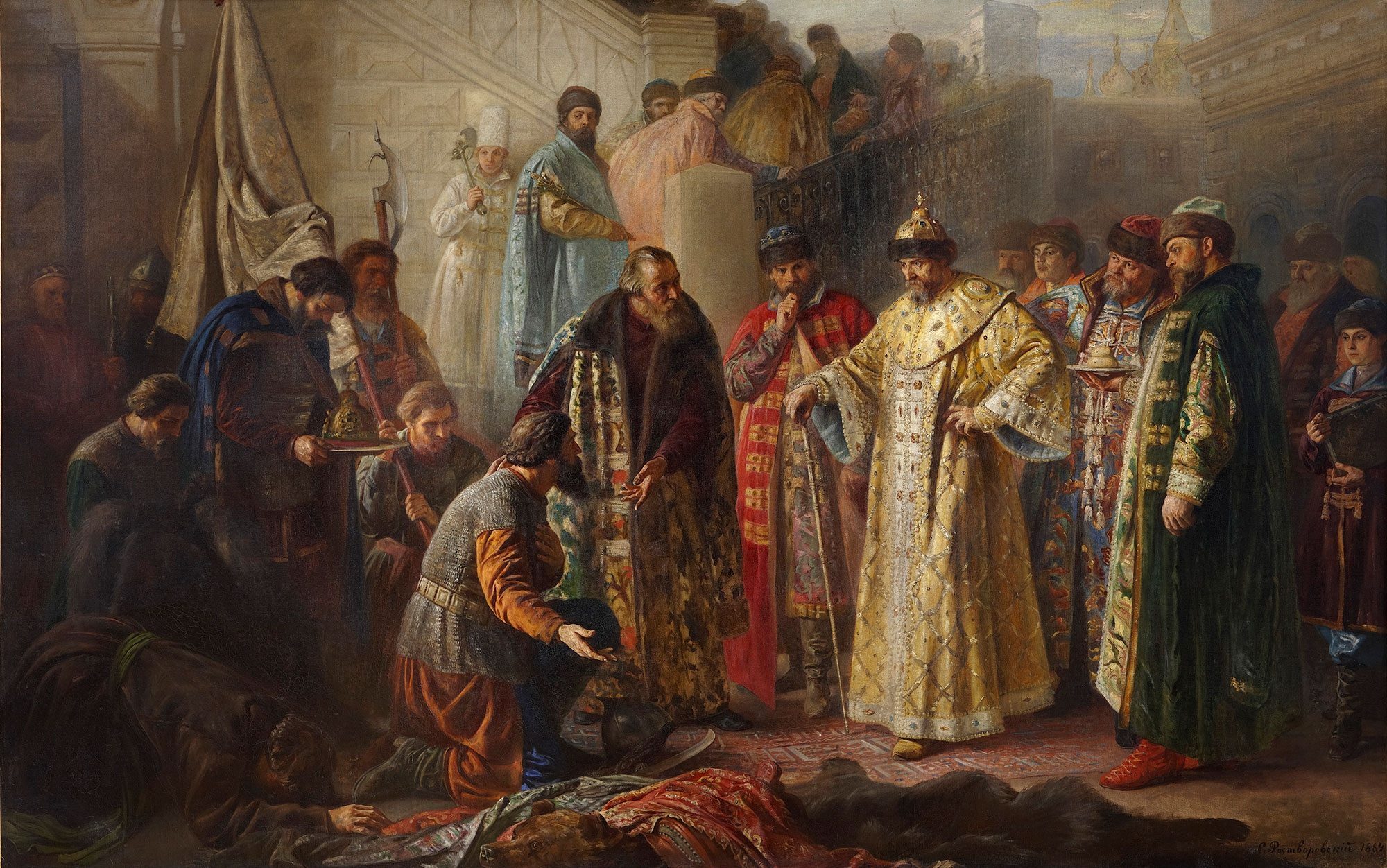
Messengers from Yermak at the Red Porch in front of Ivan the Terrible; by Stanisław Jakub Rostworowski

In the late 1500s, prior to Yermak's expeditions, the Russians attempted to push eastward into Siberia in search of furs. Under Ivan the Great, the Russians entered northwest Siberia but "to approach Siberia from that direction proved too arduous and difficult, even in the best of times." The Russians decided that taking a southern route through the Tatar khanate of Kazan would allow them to penetrate Siberia more easily, but Kazan would need to be overthrown first. Ivan the Terrible's first foreign objective upon rising to power was to take Kazan. Ivan the Terrible's modernized army proved successful at the beginning of October 1552 and Ivan proceeded to open up the east to enterprising Russian individuals, such as the Stroganovs. Anika Stroganov used the former khanate of Kazan as an entryway into Siberia and established a private empire on the southwest corner of Siberia.

Following the Russian conquest under Ivan the Terrible, the Tatar khanate of Kazan became the Russian province of Perm. Ivan the Terrible had tremendous trust in the entrepreneurial prowess of the Stroganov family and granted them the province of Perm as a financial investment which would be sure to benefit Russia in the future. The tsar also gave the Stroganovs permission to expand into the territory along the Tobol and Irtysh Rivers which belonged to the Muslim leader Kuchum Khan. The Stroganovs proceeded to launch expeditions eastward into non-Russian territories. They pushed into the khanate of Sibir, the sister state of the former khanate of Kazan, because it maintained control over Siberia's fur in the west.

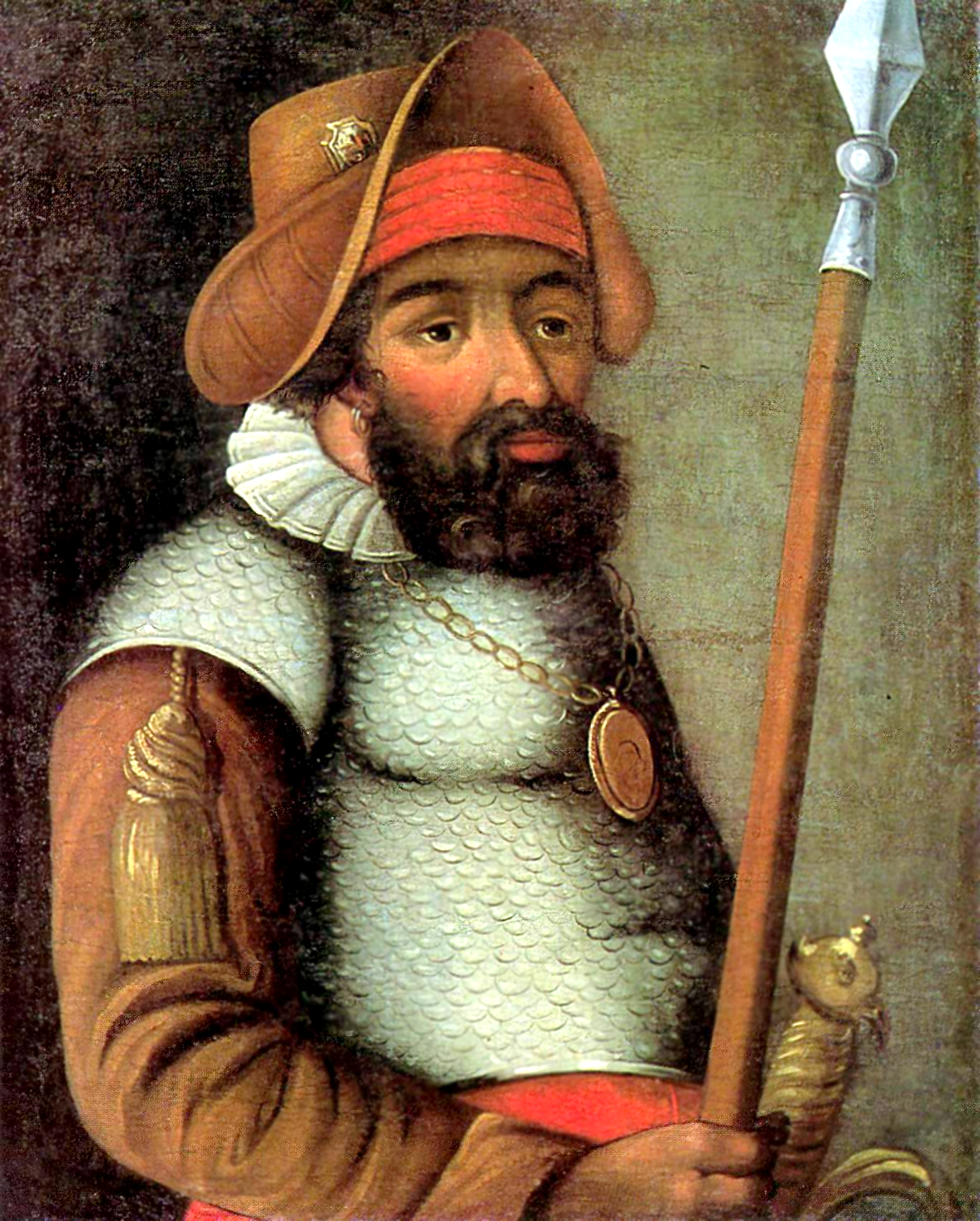
A portrait fantasy from the late 18th century

During the time of the Russian conquest of Kazan in the 1540s and 1550s, Sibir had been undergoing conflicts of its own with rival clans. The khanate was on the precarious ground until the rise of Kuchum Khan, a descendant of the famed Chingis Khan, in the 1560s. Kuchum Khan built up allies among his neighbors and the Crimean Tatars in order to thwart the Stroganovs' expansion across the Urals. In July 1572, Kuchum launched his first raid on Stroganov settlements, which resulted in almost one hundred deaths. In 1573, the Tatar army expanded and changed leadership. Kuchum's nephew, Mahmet-kul, assumed control of the Tatar army. The Stroganovs realized that they could no longer expect their settlers to remain in the lands around Perm if they only fought a defensive battle. The tsar granted the Stroganov family permission to invade Asia. However, the tsar soon changed his mind and told the Stroganovs to retract from Siberia, fearing that Russia did not have the resources or manpower to topple Kuchum Khan's empire.

The Stroganovs decided to ignore the tsar's orders and, in the late 1570s, Anika Stroganov's grandsons Nikita and Maksim recruited Cossack fighters to wage war on their behalf. They elected the Cossack chieftain Yermak Timofeyevich as the leader of the Cossack brigades. According to the Stroganov Chronicle, on April 6, 1579, after hearing of Yermak's and his comrades' "daring and bravery," the Stroganovs sent a letter to the men asking them to come to their ancestral estates in Chusovaya and summoning them to fight against the Tatars in the name of the tsar. Since Yermak had been the most illustrious of the recruits, he became the captain (ataman) of the "conquest of Siberia." However, there remains the question as to whether Yermak, in fact, decided to fight the war of his own accord without being pursued by the Stroganovs. This question arose due to the discrepancy between the narratives of the Stroganov Chronicle and a different Siberian chronicle, the Yespiov Chronicle. The Stroganov Chronicle portrays the family as the motivating force behind Yermak's campaign while the Yesipov Chronicle fails even to mention the family. Perhaps the Stroganovs told the story in a way that would inspire the Russian people to feel just as indebted to them as to Yermak for the conquest of Siberia. Siberian historians are divided on the matter, some believing that the Stroganovs were behind Yermak's campaign and others believing that they played no part in it.

== Conquest of Siberia ==
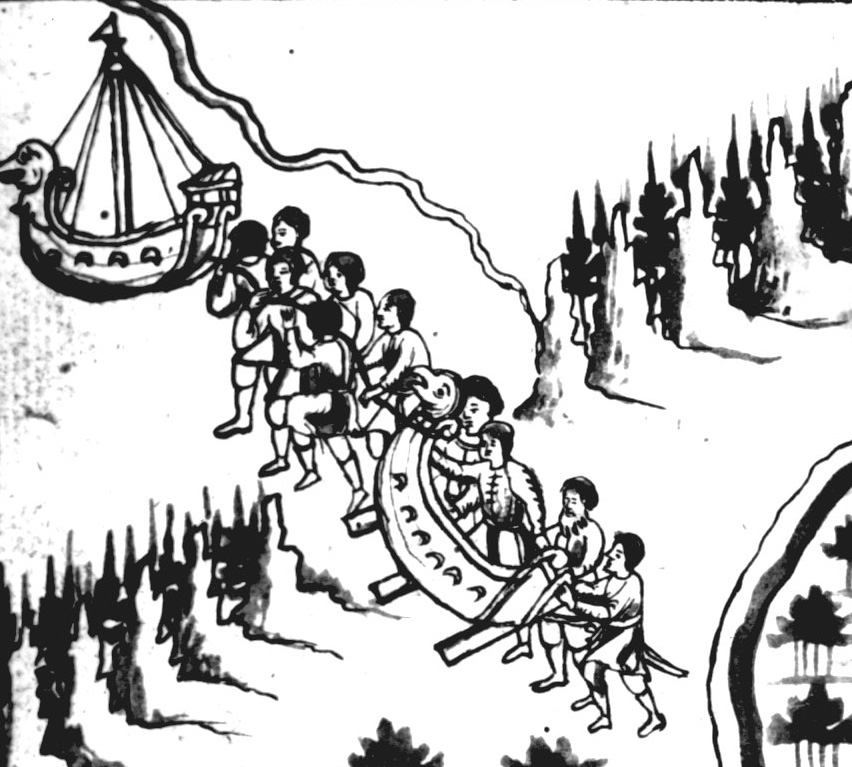
Yermak used river portages to get from the Chusovaya River to the Tagil River

Yermak was officially enlisted by the Stroganovs in the spring of 1582. His quest was "to take de facto possession of the country along the Tobol and the Irtysh, which was already de jure in the Stroganovs' possession under the Tsar's charter of 1574." The Stroganovs' ultimate goal was to open up a southern passageway to Mangaseya to access its furs. The Khanate of Sibir blocked the road from the Urals to Mangaseya. After overthrowing the khanate, the intended final destination of Yermak's five thousand mile journey was the Bering Strait. Yermak led a small army of 840 men, made up of 540 of his own followers and three hundred supplied by the Stroganovs. His army was composed of "Russians, Tatars, Lithuanians, and Germans." The Lithuanians and Germans of the crew came from the Lithuanian front. Nikita and Maksim Stroganov spent twenty thousand rubles of their riches to outfit the army with the best weapons available. This was especially to the advantage of the Russian detachment because their Tatar opponents did not have industrial weapons. According to Russian history specialist W. Bruce Lincoln, the Tatars' "bows, arrows, and spears" went up against Yermak's team's "matchlock muskets, sabers, pikes, and several small cannons." However, according to the Russian author Yuri Semyonov, "Yermak had no cannon, and only a small number of his men carried firearms. The Cossacks had not a single horse, while Kuchum and his men were mounted. His cavalry could move quickly in any direction, while the Cossacks were tied to their rafts, which were laden with all their supplies."

Yermak first embarked on his journey through Siberia from a frontier fort in Perm on the Chusovaya River on September 1, 1582, though other sources claim that he may have started his campaign in 1579 or 1581. When navigating down rivers, the crew used high-sided boats that originated in Russia. Throughout their journey, they encountered violent opposition from Kuchum Khan's native allies but the high sides of their boats acted as shields. When crossing the Urals, the Cossacks had to carry their possessions on their backs because they did not have horses. After two months, Yermak's army had finally crossed the Urals. They followed the river Tura and found themselves at the outskirts of Kuchum Khan's empire. Soon they reached the kingdom's capital city of Qashliq. On October 23, 1582, Yermak's army fought the Battle of Chuvash Cape, which initiated three days of fighting against Kuchum's nephew, Mehmet-kul, and the Tatar army. Yermak's infantry blocked the Tatar charge with mass musket fire, which wounded Mahmet-kul and prevented the Tatars from scoring a single Russian casualty. Yermak succeeded in capturing Qashliq and the battle came to mark the "conquest of Siberia." The Stroganov Chronicle provides an account of Kuchum Khan's reaction to the attack on Qashliq and Yermak's success:

Khan Kuchyum, seeing his ruin and the loss of his kingdom and riches, said to all his men with bitter lamentation: 'O murzas and princes, let us flee without delaying…The Stroganovs sent men of the common people against me from their forts to avenge on me the evil I had inflicted; they sent the atamans and Cossacks, Yermak and his comrades, with not many of their men. He came upon us, defeated us and did us such great harm.'

While Yermak had succeeded in taking Qashliq, the battle had reduced his Cossack force to 500 men. Yermak also now faced a supply problem. While the army had found treasures such as fur, silk, and gold in the Tatar city, no food or provisions had been left behind. The inhabitants had also fled the city, preventing their enlistment for aid. However, four days after Yermak claimed Qashliq the people returned, and Yermak soon befriended the Ostyak people. The Ostyaks would formally declare their allegiance to Yermak on October 30, complementing their pledge by delivering offerings of food to the city.

Vasily Surikov's 1895 painting "Yermak's Conquest of Siberia".

Yermak used the Ostyak tributes to feed his band of Cossacks throughout the winter. However, these supplies proved to be insufficient, and the Cossacks soon ventured into the wilderness to fish and hunt. The Cossacks' task was not without trouble, as although Yermak had defeated the Tatars they continued to harass the Cossacks, preventing Yermak from establishing complete control over the region. The Tatars struck a decisive blow on December 20, when a Cossack party of twenty men were discovered and slain. Upon their failure to return, Yermak left the city to investigate, eventually finding that Mahmet-kul had recovered from their earlier battle and was responsible for the Cossacks' murder. Yermak then entered into battle with Mahmet-kul and his forces, defeating him once again.

The defeat of Mahmet-kul provided a brief respite to the Cossacks. However, in April 1583, he returned to the region. In an unfortunate twist of fate, Mahmet-kul was quickly ambushed and captured by a small party of Cossacks, whose numbers ranged from as little as 10 to as many as 50. A few days after his capture, Mahmet-kul sent a messenger to Kuchum stating that he was alive and in good health. He also requested that the Khan cease attacks on the Cossacks and those bringing tribute to Yermak. Yermak, taking advantage of this lull in hostilities, set out down the Irtysh and Ob to complete his subjugation of the local tribal princes. He soon encountered the Ostyak prince Demian, who had fortified himself in a fortress on the banks of the Irtysh with 2,000 loyal fighters. It is reported to have taken Yermak and his men considerable time to break through their defenses due to Demian's possession of a gilded idol. Yermak's forces eventually prevailed; however, upon entering the fort, no idol was found. After dispersing a group of priests and warriors by brandishing their firearms, Yermak determined to subdue the most influential Ostyak prince of the region, Samar, who had joined forces with eight other princes. Yermak, noting that Samar had failed to place guards around his encampment, launched a surprise attack, killing Samar and disbanding his forces. Yermak was then able to secure tribute from the eight other princes. After this conquest, he continued down the river, succeeding in capturing the key Ostyak town of Nazym. Yermak's friend, Ataman Nikita Pan, and several Cossacks lost their lives in the battle. Yermak then directed his forces down the river Ob, conquering several small forts. After reaching a point at which the river broadened to a point of three or four versts, Yermak halted the expedition and returned his forces to Qashliq.

Upon returning to Qashliq, Yermak decided to inform the Stroganovs and the tsar of his conquests. While his reasons for this are unclear, experts believe that, in addition to wishing to clear his name of earlier misdeeds, Yermak also desperately needed supplies. To his end, he sent his trusted lieutenant Ivan Kolzo with fifty men, two letters (one each for the Stroganovs and Ivan the Terrible), and a large assortment of furs for the tsar. The exact amount sent to the tsar is disputed, as descriptions range from 2,500 to 5,000 to sixty sacks of furs. Kozo's arrival at the Stroganovs was well-timed, as Maksim Stroganov had just received a letter from Ivan denouncing Yermak and threatening him and his followers with death. Kolzo, bearing news of Kuchum's defeat, Mahmet-kul's capture, and the subjugation of Tatar lands, was thus well received by a relieved Maksim. Maksim provided Kolzo with lodging, food, and money before sending him on his way.

Kolzo, upon reaching Moscow, was granted an audience with Ivan despite having a Muscovite bounty on his head. To the detriment of Moscow's interests, the Livonian War had just been ended and Ivan had begun receiving reports of local tribesman conducting raids in Perm, putting him in a foul mood. Upon reading the news born by Kolzo concerning the extension of his dominion, Ivan became overjoyed, immediately pardoning the Cossacks and proclaiming Yermak to be a hero of the first degree. The triumphant atmosphere extended across the city, as church bells were tolled throughout Moscow to glorify Yermak. Ivan then had many gifts prepared for Yermak, including his personal fur mantle, a goblet, two suits of armor emblazoned with bronze double-headed eagles, and money. Ivan also commanded that a band of streltsy be sent to reinforce Yermak. Reports differ on whether 300 or 500 men were sent. The Stroganovs were also ordered to support this group with an additional fifty men upon their arrival in Perm. Yermak was bestowed the title "Prince of Siberia" by Ivan, who also commanded that Mahmet-kul be sent to Moscow.

Upon returning to Qashliq, Kolzo informed Yermak of the tsar's command that Mahmet-kul be delivered to him. Yermak, aware that doing so would eliminate Kuchum's only motive for peace, nonetheless obeyed the tsar and arranged for his transport. Unsurprisingly, Kuchum's forces began to increase the frequency of their raids. Yermak now found himself in a predicament, as a long winter had prevented the gathering of supplies and tributes and the tsar's reinforcements had not yet arrived. Under orders from the tsar, the Stroganovs had contributed fifty cavalries to the reinforcement party. However, the horses had slowed the party to a crawl across the Siberia landscape, and they did not even cross the Urals until the spring of 1584.

In September 1583, a call for help from a Tatar leader named Karacha was delivered to Yermak begging for assistance against the Nogai Tatars. Yermak, wary of Karacha but nonetheless disposed to help, deployed Kolzo with a force of 40 Cossacks. Karacha, however, was not to be trusted, as Kolzo and his men walked into an ambush and were all killed. Now without Kolzo, Yermak was left with a little more than 300 men. Sensing Yermak's waning power, the tribes previously under his control revolted, and Qashliq soon came under siege by a collective army of Tatars, Voguls, and Ostyaks. Cleverly, they encircled the city with a line of wagons, both preventing passage to and from the city while protecting the attackers from the Russians' firearms. Yermak, despite having limited supplies, was able to endure the blockade for three months. However, the Cossacks could not last forever, and on the cloudy night of June 12, 1584, Yermak decided to act. Stealthily penetrating the line of wagons, Yermak's men were able to surprise the gathered forces in their sleep, killing a large number. As Karacha's forces had been caught completely unaware, Yermak was able to recover a substantial amount of provisions from the barricade. Karacha, having failed in his mission, was punished by Kuchum, who sentenced Karacha's two sons to death. Karacha, fueled by the loss of his sons, regrouped the native tribes and returned to assault Yermak the next day. Karacha's forces, however, were soundly defeated, as the Cossacks were able to kill one hundred men with only two dozen deaths of their own.

Defeated and disgraced, Karacha fled south to the steppes of the Ishim, where Kuchum waited. Freed from confinement, Yermak turned to the offensive, conquering many towns and forts to the east of Qashliq and extending the tsar's dominion. Having already regained the loyalty of the revolting tribes, Yermak continued sailing up the Irtysh throughout the summer of 1584 to subdue tribes and demand tribute. Although he attempted to search for Karacha, Yermak was ultimately unsuccessful in this venture. Also, while Yermak had succeeded in regaining the loyalty of the tribes, his men were now almost completely out of gunpowder. To make matters worse, while his reinforcements arrived, they did so utterly exhausted and depleted by scurvy. Indeed, many of the men, including their commanding officer, had not survived the journey. Thus, in addition to facing the problem of escalating hostilities, their food shortage was magnified by the arrival of more men. Eventually, it is reported the situation grew dire enough that Yermak's men turned to cannibalism, eating the bodies of the deceased.

== Yermak's death ==
The precise details of Yermak's death are lost to history, but legend has preserved multiple variations of the account. With the onset and worsening of the food shortage, Yermak's people had now entered a time of famine. Kuchum, knowing this, set a trap. The most common account is that Kuchum purposely leaked information to Yermak, in which it was claimed that Bukharan merchants from Central Asia, traveling with large amounts of food, were being prevented from moving by Kuchum's men. In August 1584, Yermak set out with a band of men to free the traders. Finding the reports to be false, Yermak ordered a return to Qashliq. Whether because of an ongoing storm or because the men were tired from rowing upstream, Yermak's force stopped on a small island formed by two branches of the Irtysh and set up camp on the night of August 4–5, 1584. Convinced that the river offered protection, Yermak's men fell asleep with no guard. Kuchum, however, had been following Yermak's party and was lying in wait. Kuchum's forces forded the river around midnight; their approach was hidden by the loudness of the storm and the dark of night. Kuchum's Tatars were upon Yermak's men so quickly that they could not use either their guns or weapons, and a slaughter ensued. In the ensuing chaos, it is reported that all but three men on the Russian side were killed, including Yermak. Legend has it that after fighting through the invaders and being wounded in the arm by a knife, Yermak, finding that their boats had been washed away in the storm, attempted to cross the river. Due to the weight of the armor gifted to him by the Tsar, Yermak sank to the bottom and drowned. At least one survivor, unburdened by such heavy armor, was able to flee across the river and return to Qashliq with news of Yermak's death.

Yermak's body was borne down the river, where seven days later it is said to have been found by a Tatar fisherman named Yanish. Easily recognizable by the eagle on his armor, Yermak's corpse was stripped and hung on a frame made out of six poles, where for six weeks archers used his body for target practice. However, it is said that animals did not feed on him and his body produced no odor and that the corpse caused fear and nightmares in the people. Heeding these omens, the Tatars buried him as a hero, killing thirty oxen in his name. His prized armor was eventually distributed among the Tatar chiefs.

== Legacy ==
Upon receiving news of Yermak's death, the Cossacks became immediately demoralized. The original band of men had dwindled to 150 fighters, and command now fell to Glukhoff, the leader of the initial group of reinforcements that the tsar had delivered to Yermak. The Cossacks soon decided to abandon Qashliq and to retreat to Russia. Before traveling a great distance, they ran into a group of one hundred reinforcements that had been sent as additional strength from the tsar. With this upturn in fortune, Yermak's band resolved to return to Qashliq and refortify their position in accordance with the tsar's will. The fast-acting and perceptive Tatars, however, had been informed of the group's flight and had retaken the city almost immediately, preventing any peaceful reoccupation of their former stronghold. Although the Tatar position appeared strong, they were no longer led by Kuchum, who had lost his power, and were thus not as stable as before. Furthermore, another three hundred reinforcements from the tsar soon arrived to join the Russians. Led by Tchulkoff, this new force provided a significant boost in fighting strength to the party. Despite the tumultuous state of the Tatar leadership and their newly received recruits, however, the Russians did not pursue another attempt on Qashliq. Instead, in a culmination of the events immediately following Yermak's fatal plunge, they founded a new settlement in 1587 on the site of what would become Tobolsk, a comfortable twelve miles from Qashliq. Although the Tatars quickly began raids against their familiar foe, after a short period they ceased, leaving the Russians to their new town.

Yermak's heroic endeavors in the Russian East laid the groundwork for future Russian expansion and settlement. Soon after Yermak and his initial band set out for Siberia, merchants and peasants followed in their wake, hoping to harness some of the fur riches that abounded in the land. This trend grew exponentially after Yermak's death, as his legend spread through the domain rapidly and, with it, the news of a land rich in furs and vulnerable to Russian influence. Colonization attempts soon followed, as Tyumen, the first known town after Yermak's death, was founded in 1586. The settling of this territory facilitated the establishment and development of Siberian agriculture. Most of these farmers were, in fact, soldiers, who grew their own sustenance out of necessity.

Yermak had set a precedent of Cossack involvement in Siberian expansion, and the exploration and conquests of these men were responsible for many of the additions to the Russian empire in the east. After the initial return of the Cossacks shortly after Yermak's death, an ambitious project of fortification began under the direction of Tsar Boris Godunov. Its achievements, including the extension of protection for Russians in the region, would drive even greater numbers of entrepreneurs to Siberia. In 1590, Tobolsk received a significant boost in prominence as it was dubbed the principal city and administrative center of the region. The fur trade also continued to grow, aided by the Cossacks, who in 1593 established the trading center of Berezof on the Ob River at the sixty-fourth latitude. The practice of collecting tributes of fur from the natives continued to spread, and in the 17th century such furs made up 25–33 percent of the income to the tsar's treasury. Thus, as soon as fifteen years after Yermak's death, the basin of the Ob River had truly become a region of Russian influence. Even so, the Russians did not rest on their laurels, and the attitude and pace of expansion pioneered by Yermak continued well into the 17th century. Indeed, within the first half of the century the fort of Yeniseysk was established in 1619, the city of Yakutsk founded in 1632, and the important feat of reaching the Sea of Okhotsk on the Pacific coast in 1639. Throughout these campaigns, Yermak's influence was undeniable, as the pace he had established for achievement in his relatively short time in Siberia heralded a new age of Russian pioneering.

Yermak's life and conquests had a significant impact on Russian policy towards Siberia and the colonization attempts that followed this shift. Prior to Yermak's agreement with the Strogonovs, the Russian attitude towards the Siberian expanse had been one preoccupied primarily with defense, not aggression. The top priority was the repelling of the Tatar hordes, and, as shown by Ivan's letter to the Strogonovs, the central government rarely involved itself unless the tribes succeeded in entering Russian territory. This, of course, changed with Yermak, whose triumphs showed that the Tatars could be put on the defensive and that Russia could now establish itself as an aggressive power in the East. Yermak also changed the involvement of the tsar in Siberian affairs. In reaching out to the tsar for assistance, Yermak gained the support of the government; indeed, it was reinforcements from the tsar that solidified the Russian presence in the region immediately after Yermak's death. This newfound commitment and involvement in the area is best summarized by Ivan's acceptance of the title bestowed upon him by Yermak: "Tsar of Sibir." Yermak's pioneering further enabled this system to exist because it depended on the success he achieved in gaining tribute from conquered peoples. Much like Yermak, future troops were sent with the understanding that it would be necessary to supplement their base payment with treasures and tributes gained from conquest. Without this system in place, it is unlikely such an arrangement would have come to fruition.

Future explorers would also take notice of Yermak's strategy in approaching the Siberian lands, which, unlike those in many other colonization attempts, already had an established imperial power. However, Yermak wisely recognized that Kuchum's territories were not unified. Yermak noted that many of these peoples were nothing more than vassals and that they were quite diverse in terms of ethnicity, language, and religion. Unlike Kuchum and his Muslim Tatars, many of these groups were pagan. Due to the sum of these differences, many simply paid tribute to avoid trouble, and it mattered little to whom the tribute was paid. Yermak's unique strength was thus in recognizing the bigger picture and playing it to his advantage, first identifying and then executing quick, efficient ways to establish influence in the region.

The actions of Yermak also redefined the meaning of the word Cossack. While it is uncertain whether Yermak's group was related in any way to the Yaik or Ural Cossacks, it is known that their company was previously outlawed by the Russian government. However, in sending his letter and his trusted lieutenant Ivan Kolzo to Ivan the Terrible, Yermak transformed the image of the Cossack overnight from a bandit to a soldier recognized by the Tsar of Moscow. Now, Yermak's Cossacks had effectively been incorporated into the military system and were able to receive support from the tsar. This new arrangement also acted as a sort of pressure-relief valve for the Cossacks, who had a history of being troublesome on the Russian frontier. In sending as many of them as possible further east into unconquered lands, the burgeoning and extremely profitable lands on the borders of Russian territory were given respite. Yermak's call for aid thus spawned a new type of Cossack which, by virtue of its link to the government, would enjoy significant favor from future Russian rulers. Despite this new shift in orientation, it is worth noting that the Cossack name remained in place in Siberia and that soldiers sent as reinforcements often adopted this title. Furthermore, this realignment was not without criticism, however, and some saw Yermak as a traitor to the Cossack name. Such detractors saw Yermak's death as punishment for turning away from the Cossack code and becoming a pawn of the tsar. Fittingly, then, it was his armor, the very symbol of the tsar, that dragged him down to his fate.

Relics of Yermak also continued to command significant power and prestige years after his death. In particular, the search for his armor affected at least one element of Siberian relations. Decades after Yermak's death, a Mongol leader who had assisted the Russian government approached the voyevoda of Tobolsk and asked for his assistance in obtaining an item in the Tatar's possession, believed to be Yermak's armor. The reason he approached the voyevoda was that he had previously been denied a trade by the Tatars after offering them ten slave families and a thousand sheep. The Tatars, despite being convinced that the armor had divine properties, agreed to the sale upon the involvement of the voyevoda. Soon after, the Mongol, convinced of the power of Yermak's armor, refused to service the Russian government because he no longer feared their might.

== Commemoration ==
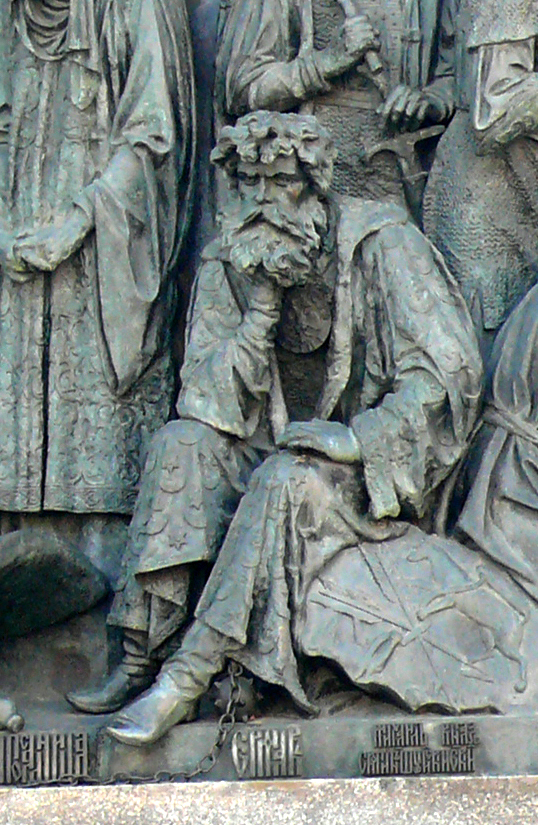
Yermak on the Millennium of Russia monument in Novgorod

Multiple statues and monuments have been erected in his honor throughout Russia. V. A. Beklemishev began his construction project for a monument dedicated to Yermak in 1903 in the Cathedral Square of Novocherkassk, the capital of the Don Cossack country. On the monument Yermak is shown holding his regimental banner in his left hand and the ceremonial cap of his rival Kuchum Khan in his right hand. The back of the monument reads: "To the Don Cossack Ataman Ermak Timofeyevich, the Siberia conqueror from the grateful posterity. In honor of Don Cossack Army 300th Anniversary. He passed away in Irtysh waves on August 5, 1584." Some believe that Yermak was born in the village of Kachalinskaya on the Don. Though this region has long claimed Yermak to be one of its own, there is no evidence that he was born there or ever visited.

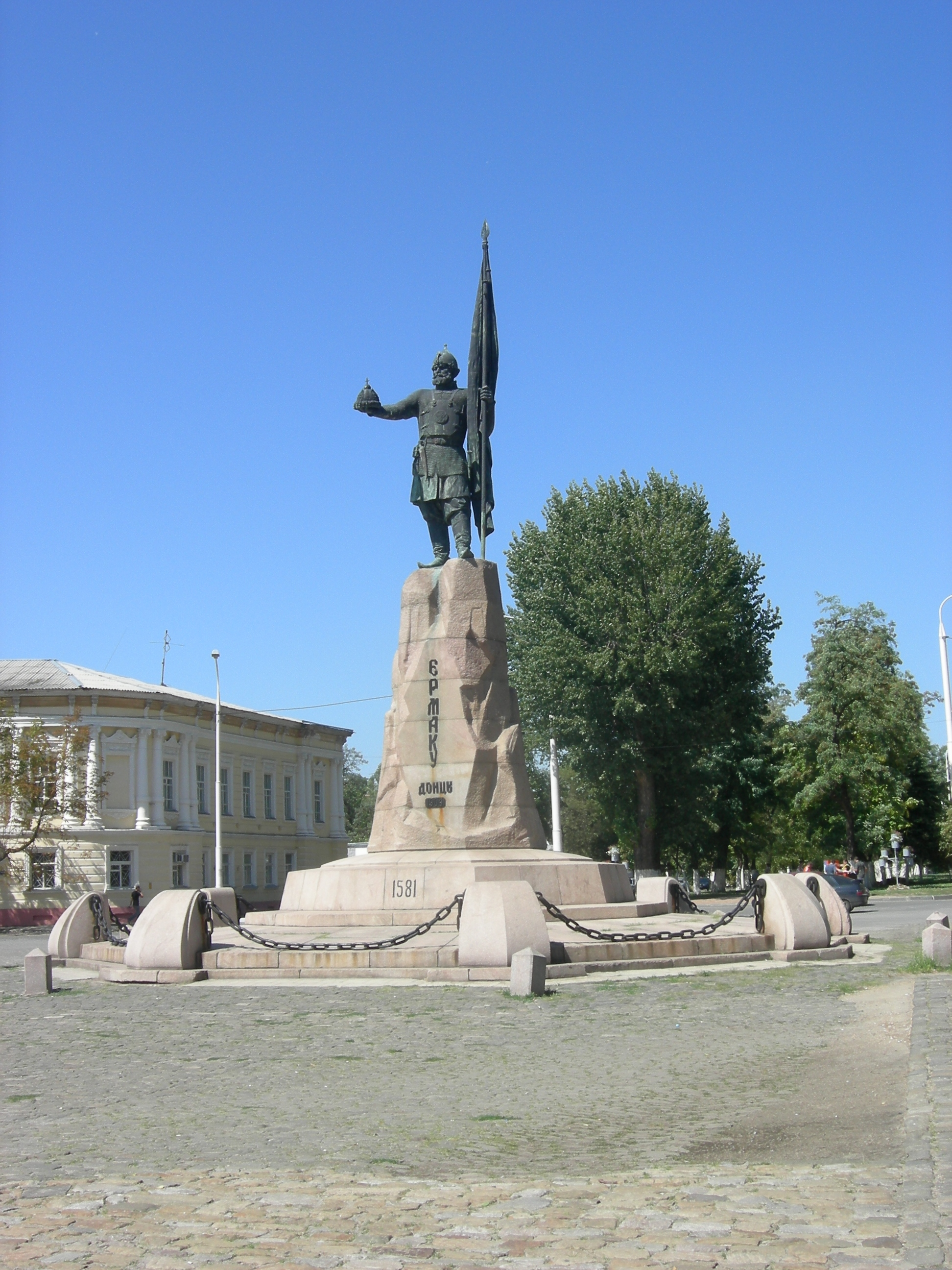
Statue of Yermak in Novocherkassk

There is also a statue of Yermak at Tobolsk and one in the State Russian Museum in Saint Petersburg designed by Mark Antokolsky.

Two icebreakers have been named after Yermak. The first, built in Newcastle, England, in 1898, was one of the first major vessels of that type ever built and the second, which entered the service in 1974, was the first of an impressive new type of ship.

In commemoration of Yermak, there is a town named after him on the upper Irtysh. Similarly, a mountain in the Perm Region made up of three cliff stacks is called the Yermak Stone after Yermak. Legend has it that Yermak and his brigade passed one of the harsh Siberian winters on the cliff side.

== In popular culture ==
=== Film ===
Yermak makes an appearance in the 1947 film Tale of the Siberian Land (Skazanie o zemle sibirskoi) directed by Ivan Pyryev. The movie tells the story of a pianist named Andrei who moves to Siberia to work at a paper-processing plant after being wounded in World War II and losing his faith in music. Once in Siberia, Andrei reunites with a female singer with whom he had been in love in Moscow. When nothing comes of their second encounter, he heads far north in Siberia and becomes so enamored with the might of Soviet construction projects that he composes a choral symphony entitled the 'Tale of Siberian Land.' Andrei is then reunited with his beloved who finds him in the depths of Siberia. The two travel to Moscow where Andrei's symphony is performed in the Conservatory. The symphony tells his life story while presenting the "mysterious, wild, silver grey" landscape of Siberia to the audience. In displaying the "extreme might of the land," he conveys "the extreme heroism of the Russian and Soviet conquest of Siberia." The symphony introduces Yermak as a mighty figure who "made his way through the fog and mist to do battle with Siberia."

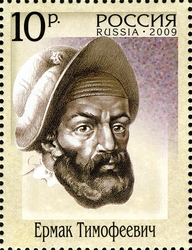
Yermak on a Russian postage stamp (2009)

The film then begins a visual montage which traces Russian history and the representation of the Russian landscape over time. Yermak is shown as a "pantomime hero" leading his forces into battle. Simon Franklin and Emma Widdis describe that "here, the director taps into the folk imagination and the landscape that he evokes is plainly the landscape of the epic. As the battle ends, the natural world itself expresses the majesty of Yermak's achievement. Fire turns into lightning, and then the rain begins: the conquest of the elements is complete, as nature bows down in the face of Russian strength, and Siberia is conquered." The montage then shifts to show the landscape as softer, flatter, and gentler. Andrei proceeds to describe the process through which Yermak's descendants continued to dominate Siberia. Ultimately, Yermak is portrayed as the hero who launched the conquest that shaped the whole of Russia.

In 1996, directors Vladimir Krasnopolsky and Valeri Uskov produced the film Yermak, a historical drama about the conquest of Siberia which starred Viktor Stepanov, Irina Alfyorova, and Nikita Dzhigurda.

=== Literature ===
- Yermak, the Conqueror of Siberia (1899) – by Leo Tolstoy
- Yermak, the Conqueror (1930) – a novel by Pyotr Nikolayevich Krassnoff
- Gulyai-Volga (1930) – a novel by Artem Vesely
- The Cossacks (1969) – by Philip Longworth, a historical account of the Cossack experience in Russia which provides portraits of famous Cossack leaders Yermak, Bogdan Khmelnitski, and Stepan Razin
- The Cossacks (1963) OUP - by Barbara Bartos-Höppner. A fictionalised and dramatised account of the life of Yermak Timofeyev from the point of view of Mitya, a young boy who becomes a Cossack and who accompanies Yermak on his invasion of Siberia. (Trans. from the German by Stella Humphries.)
- Yermak's Campaign in Siberia (1974) – translated from Russian by Tatiana Minorsky and David Wileman and edited, with an introduction and notes, by Terence Armstrong
- In addition to his nonfiction portrayals in the books listed above, Yermak and his expeditions of conquest are mentioned in The Zombie Survival Guide by Max Brooks, as well as being featured in its accompanying tie-in comic Recorded Attacks, wherein an expeditionary party of Yermak seizes a Siberian settlement of an unknown Asiatic tribe, engaging in slaughter and cannibalism, before themselves succumbing to a revived, apparently zombified woman whom they had dug up, leaving only one survivor.

=== Folk songs and poetry ===
There are many folk songs and much poetry about Yermak. By tracing the transformation of folk songs and poetry about Yermak since his death, it is possible to see how his status as a legendary figure has evolved over time.

Over 150 songs about Yermak's exploits have been collected and spread throughout all of Russia since the 18th century. As many as 35 of these songs have been collected in a text by V. Th. Miller entitled "Historical Songs of the Russian People of the XVI-XVII Centuries." One song describes how "Yermak's men kill the Muscovite ambassador to Persia named as Semen Konstantinovich Karamyshev" while others speak of Yermak's acts of piracy and pillaging with his Cossack brigade. Though most folk songs are not entirely consistent with the historical accounts of Yermak's life, there are many similarities and much overlap among the different songs. There are often several versions of the same song that share certain details but differ on others.

I. I. Dmitriyev (1760–1837) wrote the dramatic poem "Yermak" and K. P. Ryleyev (1795–1826) in 1821 wrote a poem entitled "The death of Yermak."

=== Paintings ===
- "The Conquest of Siberia by Yermak" (1895) by Vasily Surikov, located in the State Russian Museum in St. Petersburg
- various paintings by Semyon Remezov in the Remezov Chronicle

=== Videogames ===
- Yermak makes an appearance in Age of Empires III: Definitive Edition, in a standalone scenario based on his conquest of Cape Chuvash, as part of the Historical Battles.

=== Other ===
- The fossil mammal Yermakia domitor from the Early Cretaceous Shestakovo locality in the Kemerovo region of western Siberia is named after Yermak.

== See also ==
- History of Siberia
- Exploration of Siberia
- Exploration of Asia
- Conquest of the Khanate of Sibir
