= Qashliq =

Medieval Tatar fortress in Russia

Coordinates: 58°08′57.1″N 68°31′10.2″E

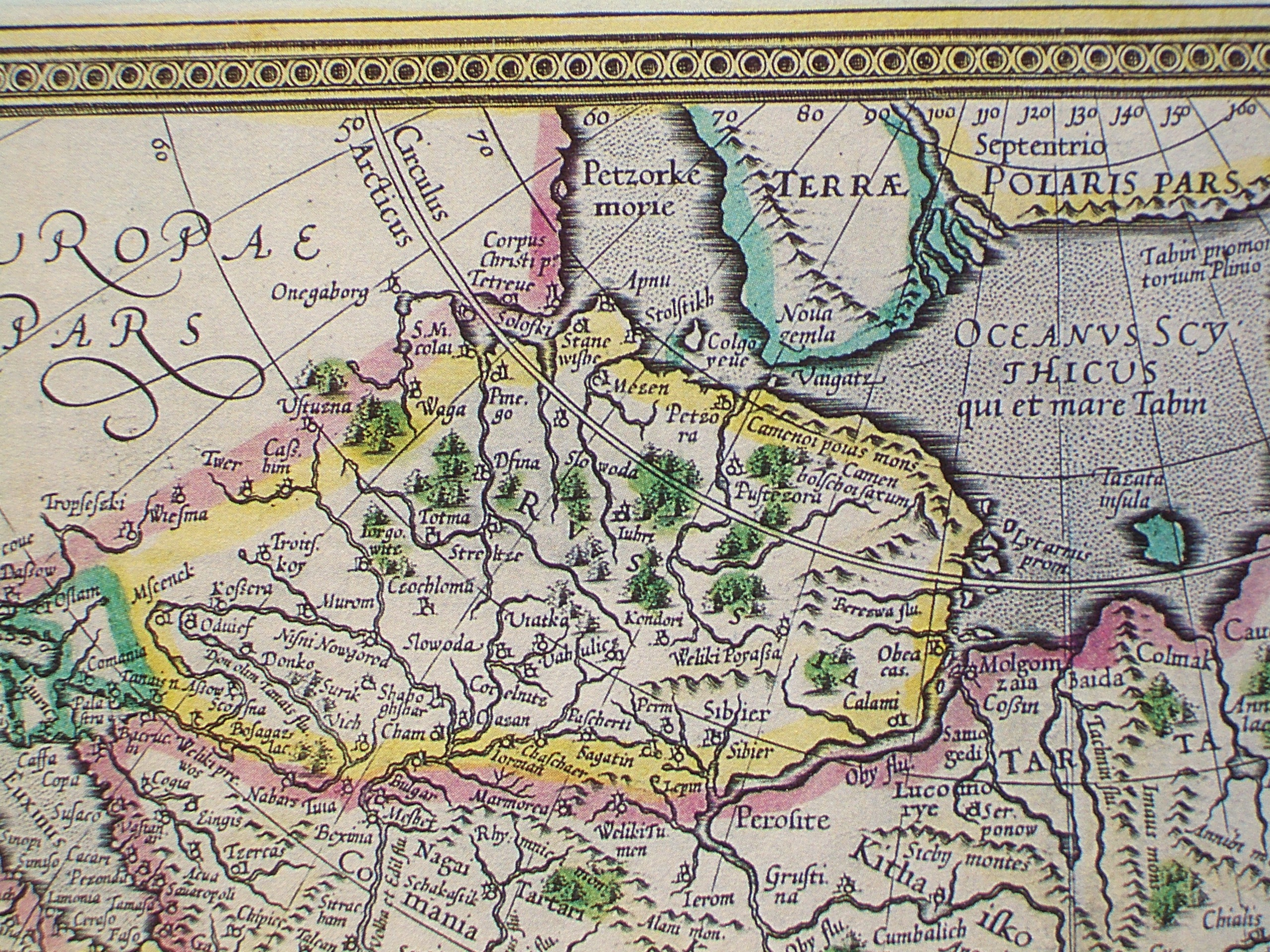
Sibier, the region and the city, can be seen on this map by Gerhard Mercator (published 1595), positioned on a left tributary of the Ob River. Mercator places Sibir correctly at about 58° northern latitude, but somewhat too much to the west.

Qashliq, Isker, or Sibir (Siberian Tatar: Искәр) was a medieval (14th–16th century) Siberian Tatar fortress, in the 16th century the capital of the Khanate of Sibir, located on the right bank of the Irtysh River at its confluence with the Sibirka rivulet, some 17 km from the modern city of Tobolsk. The fortress is first mentioned in Russian sources of the 14th century.

The period of the most development was in the first half of the 16th century. In 1582, the troops of Cossack ataman Yermak seized and ruined Qashliq. The ruined city was retaken by the Siberian Tatars in 1584 only to be lost forever in 1586. The nearby city of Tobolsk was founded in 1587.

Sources differ on the exact location of the fortress. Most give the distance upriver from Tobolsk as 17 or 18 km, or versts, or ten to eleven miles, but others give 23 km. Sources of the early 19th century claim that the ruins of the fortress could still be made out with difficulty. The modern village of Sibiryak (поселок Сибиряк) is located close to the site.
