= Khanate of Sibir =

1468–1598 Siberian Tatar Khanate in southwestern Siberia

Coordinates: 57°30′34″N 67°06′58″E

Khanate of Sibir Себер ҡанныҡ
- 1468–1598
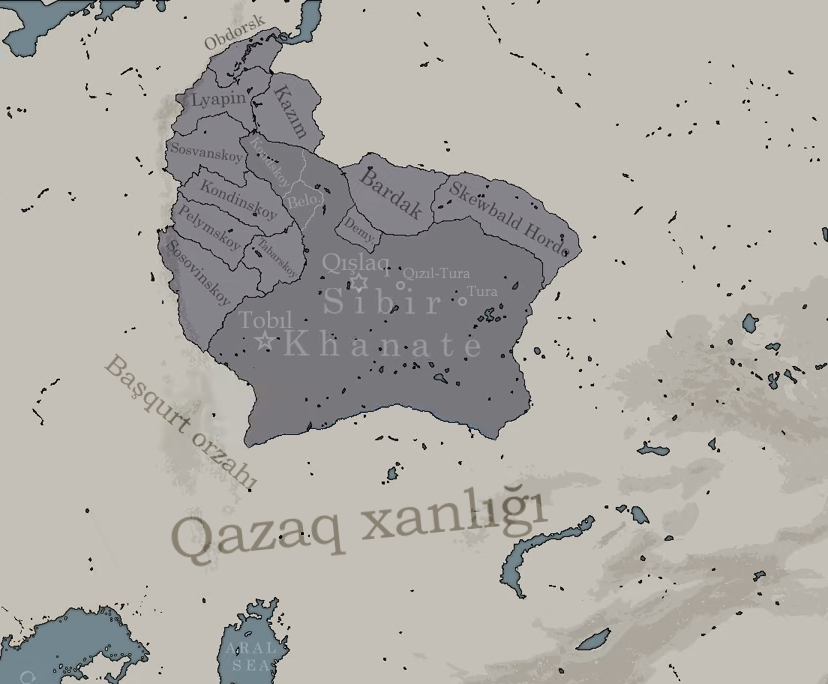
- Approximate extent of the Khanate of Sibir during the 15th and 16th centuries
- Capital: Chimgi-Tura, Qashliq
- Official languages: Siberian Tatar, Chagatai language
- Common languages: Siberian Tatar, Selkup, Khanty, Mansi
- Religion: Sunni Islam, Shamanism
- Demonyms: Sibirian; Siberian
- Government: Khanate
- Khan
  - 1420–1428: Hajji Muhammad
  - 1428–1468: Abu'l-Khayr Khan (as Uzbek Khan)
  - 1468–1495: Ibak Khan
  - 1563–1598: Kuchum
- History
  - Abu'l-Khayr Khan becomes Khan of Sibir: 1428
  - Ibak Khan establishes Chimgi-Tura as an independent khanate: 1468
  - Conquered by the Tsardom of Russia: 1598
Preceded by	Succeeded by
Golden Horde; Uzbek Khanate	Tsardom of Russia
- Today part of: Russia

The Khanate of Sibir (Siberian Tatar: Себер ҡанныҡ, romanized: Seber qannïq; Russian: Сибирское ханство, Сибирский юрт, romanized: Sibirskoye khanstvo, Sibirsky yurt) was a Siberian Tatar state in western Siberia. It was founded at the end of the 15th century, following the break-up of the Golden Horde. Throughout its history, members of the Shaybanid and Taibugid dynasties often contested the rulership over the Khanate between each other; both of these competing tribes were direct patrilineal descendants of Genghis Khan through his eldest son Jochi and Jochi's fifth son Shayban (Shiban) (died 1266). The area of the Khanate had once formed an integral part of the Mongol Empire; it later came under the control of the White Horde, and under the Golden Horde from 1242 to 1468.

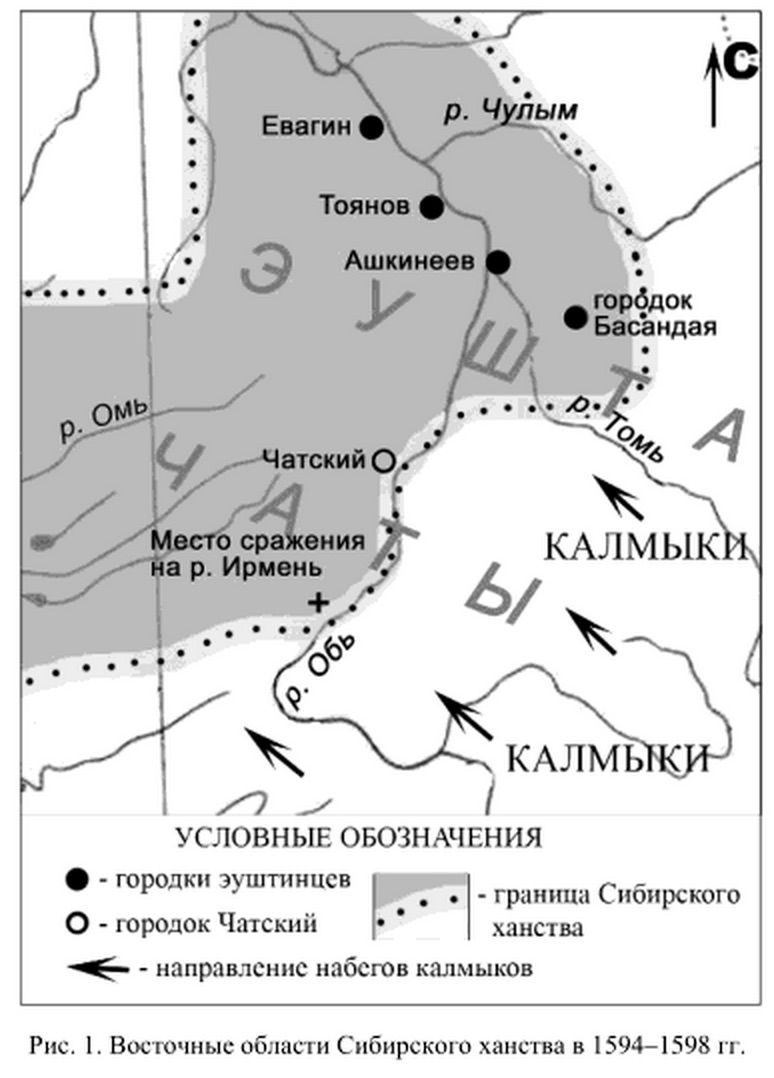
Eastern region of the Khanate of Sibir in 1594-1598

The Khanate of Sibir had an ethnically diverse population of Turkic peoples – Siberian Tatars and various Uralic peoples – including the Khanty, the Mansi, and the Selkup. The Sibir Khanate was the northernmost Muslim state in recorded history. Its defeat by Yermak Timofeyevich in 1582 marked the beginning of the Russian conquest of Siberia.

== Geography ==
Khanate of Sibir bordered Great Perm, Nogai Horde, Kazakh Khanate, and Teleuts. On the most northern part it reached the lower reaches of the Ob river, while its eastern neighbor was Skewbald Horde.

== Aristocracy ==
The Sibir Khanate was administered by mirzas (which is a noble title) who originated from various indigenous Siberian tribes. These mirzas organized loosely knit dominions, which were all under the nominal authority of the khan of Tyumen and Sibir. Mirzas also led the warriors of the Khanate of Sibir into battle and owed nominal allegiance to the khan of Tyumen and Sibir.

== Culture ==
Islam was the state religion of the Khanate of Sibir and was practised not only by the Khans and Mirzas (the nobility) who were often educated in the Islamic centres of Central Asia (Bukhara, Samarkand etc) but by large sections of the urban and settled population as well. Mosques, madrasas and fortified settlements were set up in the major centres of Chimgi-Tura (Tyumen) and Qashliq (Sibir).

While the indigenous Uralic peoples (the Khanty and Mansi) and various nomadic groups continued to follow traditional forms of shamanism or syncretic belief, Islam had taken hold amongst the Turkic peoples long before the 16th century via Khwarezmian and Volga Bulgar merchants and also via missionaries of the Naqshbandi Sufi order who arrived from the late 14th century onwards. Under Kuchum Khan in the 1570s state sponsored Islamisation really got going. He brought in Islamic scholars, imams and settlers (the so-called Siberian Bukharans) from Bukhara and Kazan to build mosques and establish Islamic schools (maktabs) in the various Tatar settlements throughout Siberia.

The Khanate of Sibir was the most northerly Muslim state in recorded history and had very extensive links with Central Asia and the Khanate of Kazan in the fields of religion, scholarship and commerce.

== History ==
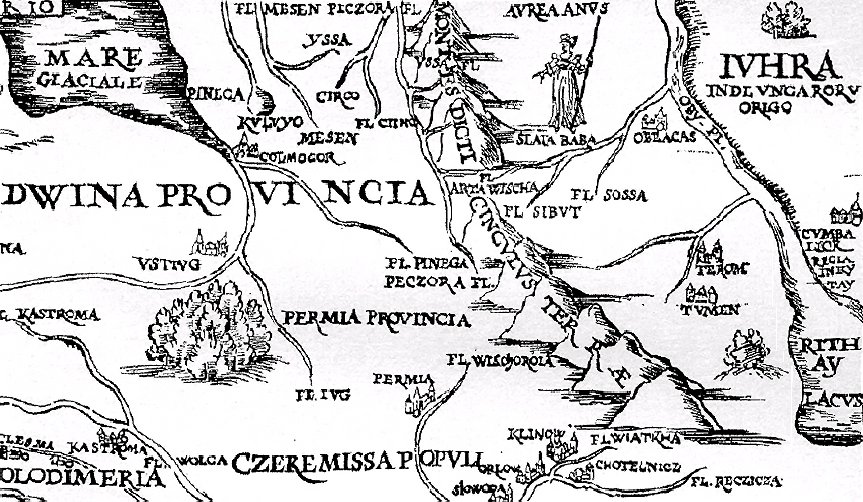
Tumen on Sigismund von Herberstein's map, published in 1549

The area was originally inhabited by mainly Samoyedic and Ugric peoples. In the 11th century, Kipchaks began inhabiting the region which led to the Turkification of the population. In the 13th century, the Mongols conquered the region and it was incorporated into the territory of the Golden Horde. Some of the Tatars who arrived with Batu Khan during the conquests settled in the area.

The original capital of the Khans was Chimgi-Tura, founded by the first Khan Taibuga, who was a member of the Borjigin. He was succeeded by his son Khoja or Hoca. The Khanate of Sibir as an independent polity was established in the fifteenth century, at a time when the Mongols of the house of Jochi were generally in a state of decline.

The Taibugids' control of the region between the Tobol and the middle Irtysh was not uncontested. The Shaybanids, descendants of Jochi, frequently claimed the area as their own. Ibak Khan, a member of a junior branch of the Shaybanid house, killed Mar and seized Chimgi-Tura. A Taibugid restoration occurred when Mar's grandson Muhammad fled to the eastern territories around the Irtysh and killed Ibak in battle in c. 1493. Muhammad decided not to remain at Chimgi-Tura, but chose a new capital named Iskar (or Sibir or Qashliq) located on the Irtysh. The Russian conquest of Kazan in 1552 prompted the Taibugid Khan of Sibir, Yadigar, to seek friendly relations with Moscow. Yadigar, however, was challenged by a Shaybanid, Ibak's grandson Kuchum. Several years of fighting (1556–1563) ended with Yadigar's death and Kuchum becoming Khan.

=== Conquest of Sibir ===
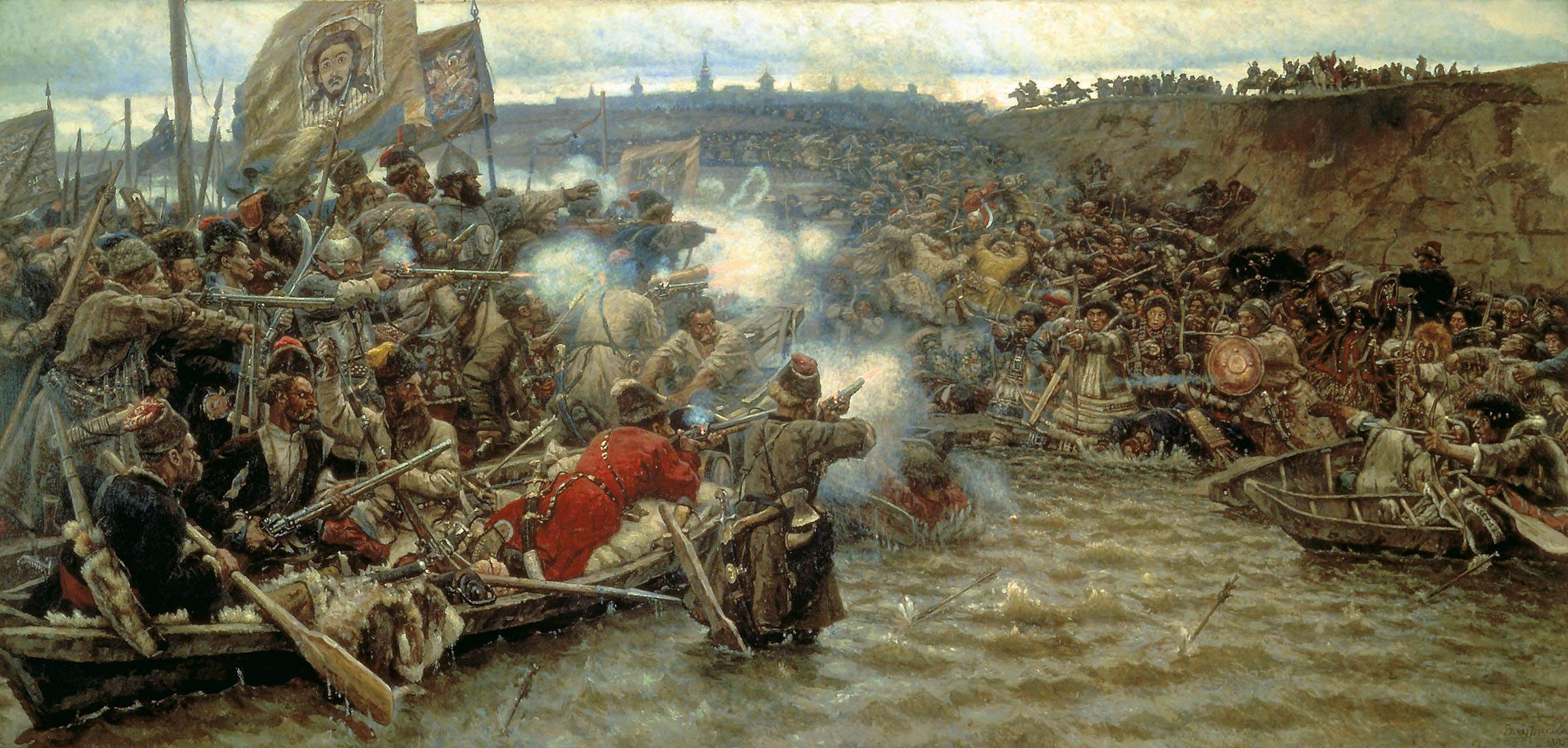
The Conquest of Siberia by Ermak, painting by Vasily Surikov

Kuchum attempted to convert the Siberian Tatars, who were mostly shamanists, to Islam. His decision to conduct a raid on the Stroganov trading posts resulted in an expedition led by the Cossack Yermak against the Khanate of Sibir. Kuchum's forces were defeated by Yermak at the Battle of Chuvash Cape in 1582 and the Cossacks entered Iskar later that year. Kuchum reorganized his forces, killed Yermak in battle in 1584, and reasserted his authority over Sibir.

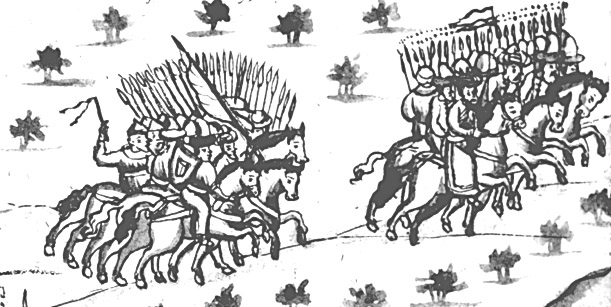
The fall of Qishlaq to Yermak, and the flight of Kuchum. A miniature from the Kungur Chronicle

Over the next fourteen years, however, the Russians slowly conquered the Khanate. In 1598 Kuchum was defeated on the banks of the Ob and was forced to flee to the territories of the Nogai, bringing an end to his rule.

== Taibugids and Shaybanids ==
The Khanate of Sibir and the town of Tyumen were founded by Taibuga sometime in the 13th century. He was probably of Keraite origin. However, some scholars also attempt to link the Taibugids to the Kipchak elites and others. Control alternated between the descendants of Taibuga and the Shaybanids who had descended from Genghis Khan. There are hints that the Shaybanids were more connected to the steppe nomads and that the Taibugids were more connected with the forest peoples to the north and east.

Taibuga's father was called On (On-Son, Onsom and other variants). Grousset says that they were 'the issue of Taibugha-bäki' without explanation ('bäki' (bek) was a princely suffix and Taibuqa was a Naiman chief at the time of Genghis Khan.) A few sources identify him with Bek Ondi Oglan, the great-great-great-grandson of Shayban, and thus a Shaybanid. The Stroganov chronicle says that On was killed by a chief called Chingi who spared Taibuga, sent him to fight the Ostyaks and granted him his own principality. Taibuga founded Tyumen and named it Chingi-tura in honor of his benefactor. Another source makes of a Nogai whose 'Hoflager' (German for 'court-camp') was Kasyl-Tura at the mouth of the Ishim River about 160 kilometres (100 mi) east of Tobolsk. Another source says that when Tokhtamysh was defeated he fled to the 'land of Sibir' (the first mention of 'Sibir' in Russian chronicles). Here he was protected by On until both were killed by Edigu about 1405.

The Sibir Khanate and main polities in Asia c. 1500

There is no more information about Taibuga except that some say he drove the Novgoroders from his lands. In 1428 a 17-year-old Shaybanid called Abu'l-Khayr Khan was chosen Khan on the Tura River (possibly at Tyumen). This implies that the Taibugids had been pushed aside. When he led his followers south for better things the remaining Shaybanids gathered around Ibak Khan, who was from a junior branch of the house. The Taibugids must have been restored because sometime between 1464 and 1480 Ibak killed the Taibugid Mar and made himself Khan. In 1483 Fyodor Kurbsky is said to have led an army to the Irtysh River, but this had no lasting effects. Ibak went to the Volga where he killed the last Khan of the Golden Horde. Returning, he was killed by Mar's grandson called Mamuk or Makhmet or Mamet (about 1495). Makhmet moved the capital from Tyumen to Sibir and was briefly Khan of Kazan (1496). In 1552 the Taibugids Yediger and Bekbulat congratulated Ivan the Terrible on his conquest of Kazan. Later they paid a limited tribute to Russia. In 1563 Ibak Khan's grandson Kuchum seized the throne from Yediger and Bekbulat. In 1573, following the Russo-Crimean War (1571) he stopped paying tribute and raided the Perm lands. In 1582, he was driven out by Yermak and died sometime after 1600.

== List of khans ==
List of Taibugids:

1. On
2. Taibugha
3. Khoja
4. Mar (killed by Ibak)
5. Obder (perhaps died as Ibak's captive)
6. Muhammad
7. Abalak (son of Obder)
8. Aguish
9. Kasim
10. Yadiger (killed by Kuchum)
11. Bekbulat (brother of Yadiger and possibly a co-regent)
12. Seid Ahmad (reoccupied Sibir after Yermak's death, captured by the Tsardom of Russia in 1588).

List of Shaybanids:

1. Ibak Khan
2. Murtaza Khan
3. Kuchum Khan
  - Ali son of Kuchum (tried to reoccupy Sibir after Yermak's death),
  - Ishim (Asim?) son of Kuchum (married a Kalmyk & settled in their territory in 1620)

== See also ==
- Indigenous peoples of Siberia
- List of Sibir khans
- Russian conquest of Siberia
- History of Siberia

== Additional sources ==
- Forsyth, James. A History of the Peoples of Siberia: Russia's North Asian Colony 1581–1990. Cambridge University Press, 1992. ISBN 0-521-40311-1
- The West Siberian Tatars by Edward J. Vajda
- Timeline Siberia at Timelines of History by Algis Ratnikas
