= Siberian River Routes =

Main ways of communication in the Russian Siberia before the 1730s

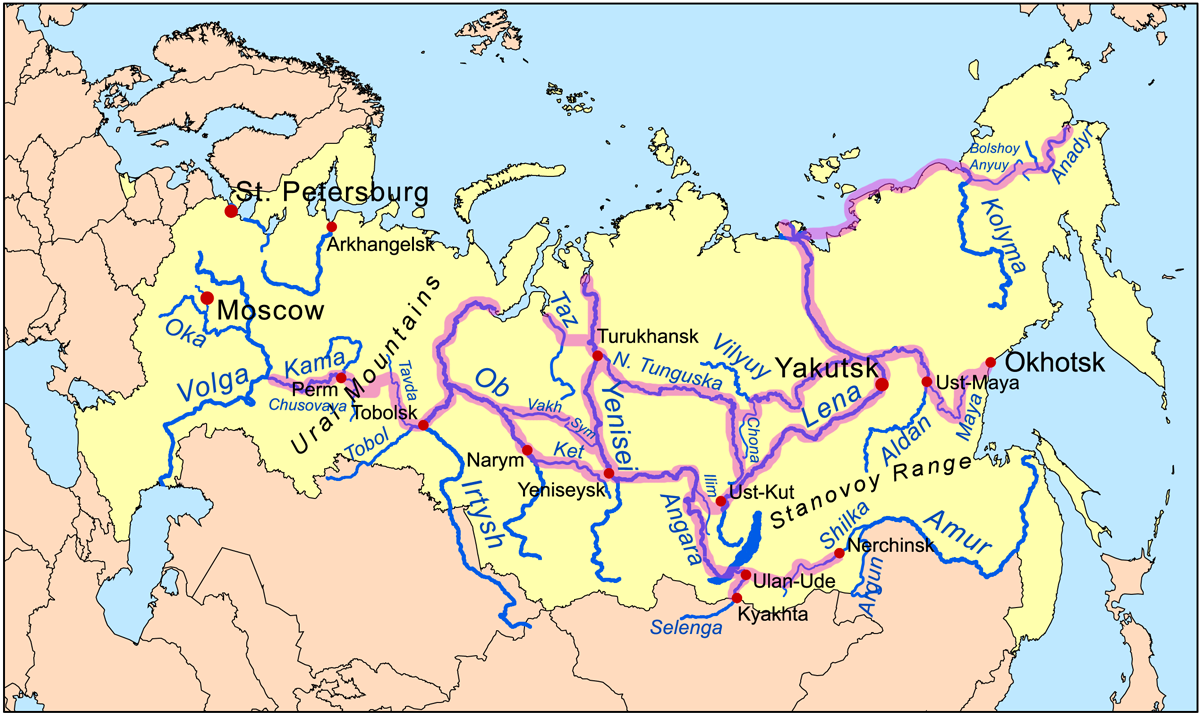
River routes based on descriptions by James Forsyth's A History of the Peoples of Siberia, 1992

Siberian River Routes were the main ways of communication in Russian Siberia before the 1730s, when roads began to be built. The rivers were also of primary importance in the process of Russian conquest and exploration of vast Siberian territories eastwards. Since the three great Siberian rivers, the Ob, the Yenisey, and the Lena all flow into the Arctic Ocean, the aim was to find parts or branches of these rivers that flow approximately east–west and find short portages between them. Since Siberia is relatively flat, portages were usually short. Despite resistance from the Siberian tribes, Russian Cossacks were able to expand from the Urals to the Pacific in only 57 years (1582–1639). These river routes were crucial in the first years of the Siberian fur trade as the furs were easier to transport over water than land. The rivers connected the major fur gathering centers and provided for relatively quick transport between them.

== Southern Route ==
Distances are straight lines and only approximate. Siberian rivers can be very crooked. Dates usually refer to the foundation of the first Russian settlement.

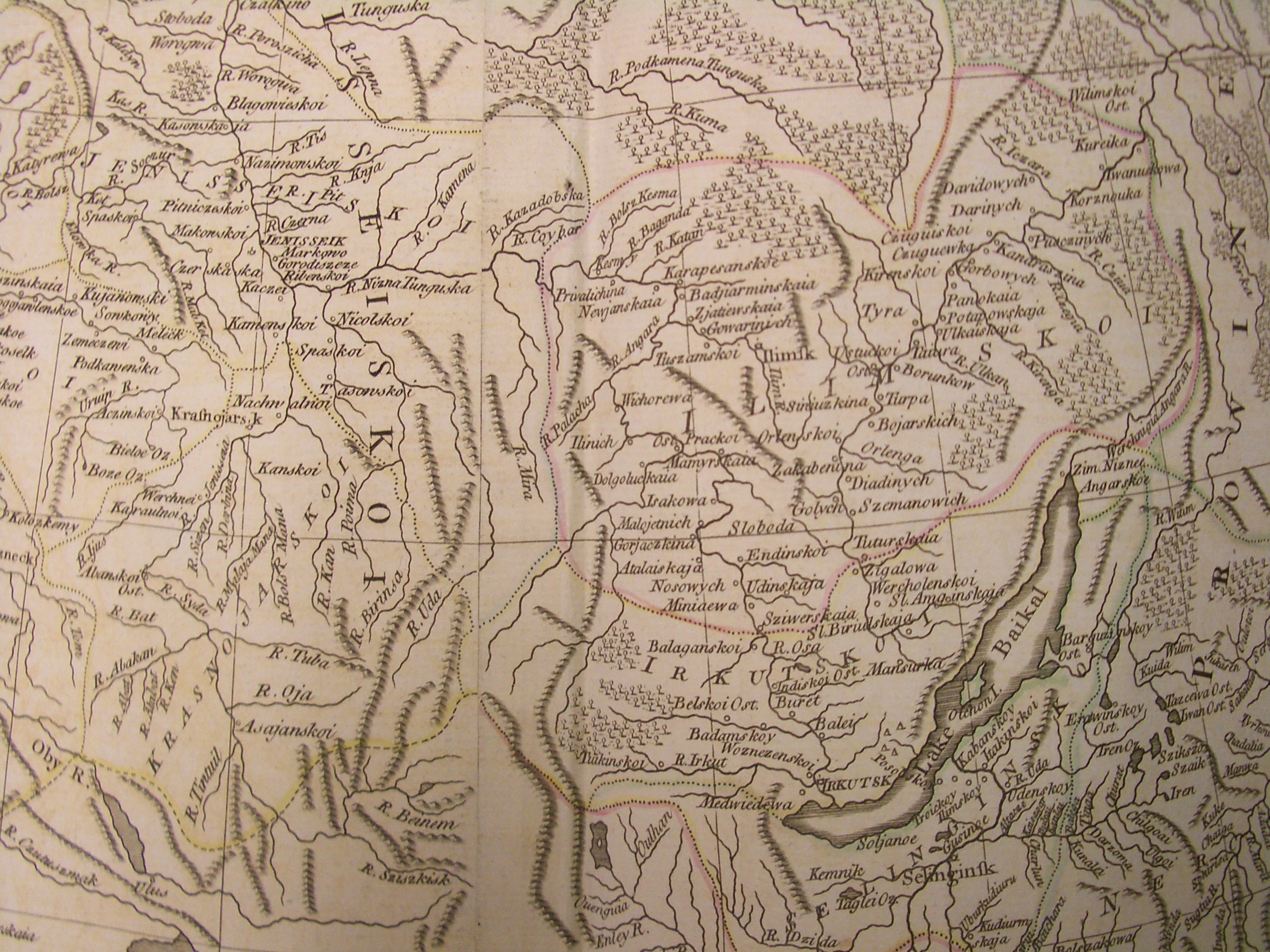
A continuous chain of populated places along the Angara, Ilim, and Lena rivers in 1773.

Over the Urals: From the Volga River, up the Kama to Perm (1472), then up the Chusovaya River, or the Vishera (see Cherdyn Route). The Urals here are only about 350 meters high, about 150 meters above the surrounding lowlands. Down either the Tavda River or Tura River and a short way up the Tobol River to its juncture with the Irtysh River at Tobolsk (1582). This was the approximate route used by Yermak. Tobolsk is about 700 km east of Perm and 1800 km east of Moscow.

The Siberian Route, a road begun in the 1730s, ran southeast from Perm to Kungur, then over another low pass to Yekaterinburg (1723) and Tobolsk. By 1885 there was a railway from Perm to Yekaterinburg. Another branch of the Trans-Siberian Railway (1891) goes south of the Urals through Chelyabinsk (1736), Omsk (1716) and Novosibirsk (1893).

Ob Basin: Near Tobolsk was the capital of the Khanate of Sibir, which was conquered in 1582. North down the Irtysh to its juncture with the Ob River, then 750 km up the Ob to Narym (1594), and up the Ket River (1602) about 300 km to its headwaters. Here a portage leads to the Yenisei River at Yeniseysk (1619). Yeniseysk is about 1400 km from Tobolsk and 3200 km from Moscow. An alternative route led from the Irtysh-Ob juncture 450 km up the Ob to the Vakh, 500 km up the Vakh, then portage to the Sym, down it to the Yenisei, upstream to Yenisesk.

Yenisey and Lena Basins: Yeniseysk is on the Yenisei River just north of its juncture with the Angara River. From Yeniseysk east up the Angara to the Ilim River, upstream to Ilimsk (1630), portage to Kuta River, short trip downstream to Ust-Kut (1631) on the Lena River. From here northeast down the Lena about 1400 km to Yakutsk, which is 4900 km east of Moscow. Yakutsk is a major stopping point and administrative center. Then 125 km down the Lena to the Aldan, up the Aldan River to Ust-Maya, then up the Maya River or its right branch, the Yudoma River.

Okhotsk: From either of the last two, it is about 150 km over 2000 ft mountains to the Pacific (Okhotsk Coast 1639, Okhotsk town, 1647). Pack horses were used here. Okhotsk is 800 km east southeast of Yakutsk and 5,600 km east of Moscow. After 1715 there were shipbuilding facilities at Okhotsk, allowing sea travel to the Kamchatka Peninsula, the Kuril Islands, the Aleutian Islands and Alaska. See also History of fur trade by Sea of Okhotsk.

To the Amur: From 1643 to 1689 the Russians attempted to penetrate from the Lena south to the Amur region but were driven back by the Manchus. See Russian-Manchu border conflicts. From 1689 to 1859 the Russo-Chinese border was the Argun River and the Stanovoy Mountains. In 1859 Russia annexed the Amur region. From the west, the Russians penetrated to Ulan-Ude (1666), Chita (1653) and Nerchinsk (1654) toward the Argun. From 1727 much Russo-Chinese trade shifted to Kyakhta near where the Selenge River crosses the current Russo-Mongol border.

== Northern Route ==
From at least the 12th century, Russian Pomors navigated the White and Barents Seas. At some date, they entered the Ob Gulf or portaged across the Yamal Peninsula. From the Gulf of Ob to the Taz Estuary, up the Taz River, past Mangazeya (1601), portage to Yanov Stan on the Turukhan River, leading to Turukhansk (1607) on the Yenisei at its juncture with the Lower Tunguska. East up the Lower Tunguska. Where it turns south, portage to the Chona River, a tributary of the Vilyuy River - the junction of these two rivers has now been flooded, forming the Viluyskoe Reservoir. East along the Vilyuy to the Lena River, and then up the Lena to Yakutsk. It was also possible to continue up the Lower Tunguska to near Kirensk (1630) (175 km northeast of Ust-Kut), make a short portage to the Lena, and down the Lena to Yakutsk. Yakutsk is about 2400 km from the Taz Estuary. After about 1700 most trade shifted south and the route west of Turukhansk was largely abandoned.

== Northeast ==
From the mouth of the Lena River, along the coast to the mouth of the Kolyma River, up to Bolshoy Anyuy River, portage, down the Anadyr River to Anadyrsk (1650). One could continue down the Anadyr to the Pacific, but the area was too barren to be of interest. The area northeast of this route was avoided because of the warlike Chukchis. About 1700 Russians entered the Kamchatka Peninsula from Anadyrsk and later sailed there from Okhotsk. It is 1800 km from Yakutsk to the Bering Strait.

== Southwest ==
After the conquest of Astrakhan in 1566, Russia expanded southeast around the southern base of the Urals. This involved increasing political control over the Nogai Horde, the Kalmyks and the northern Kazakhs, followed by varying degrees of peasant colonization. Another route was up the Irtysh toward the Altai country (Semipalatinsk, 1718).

== Decline of the River Route ==
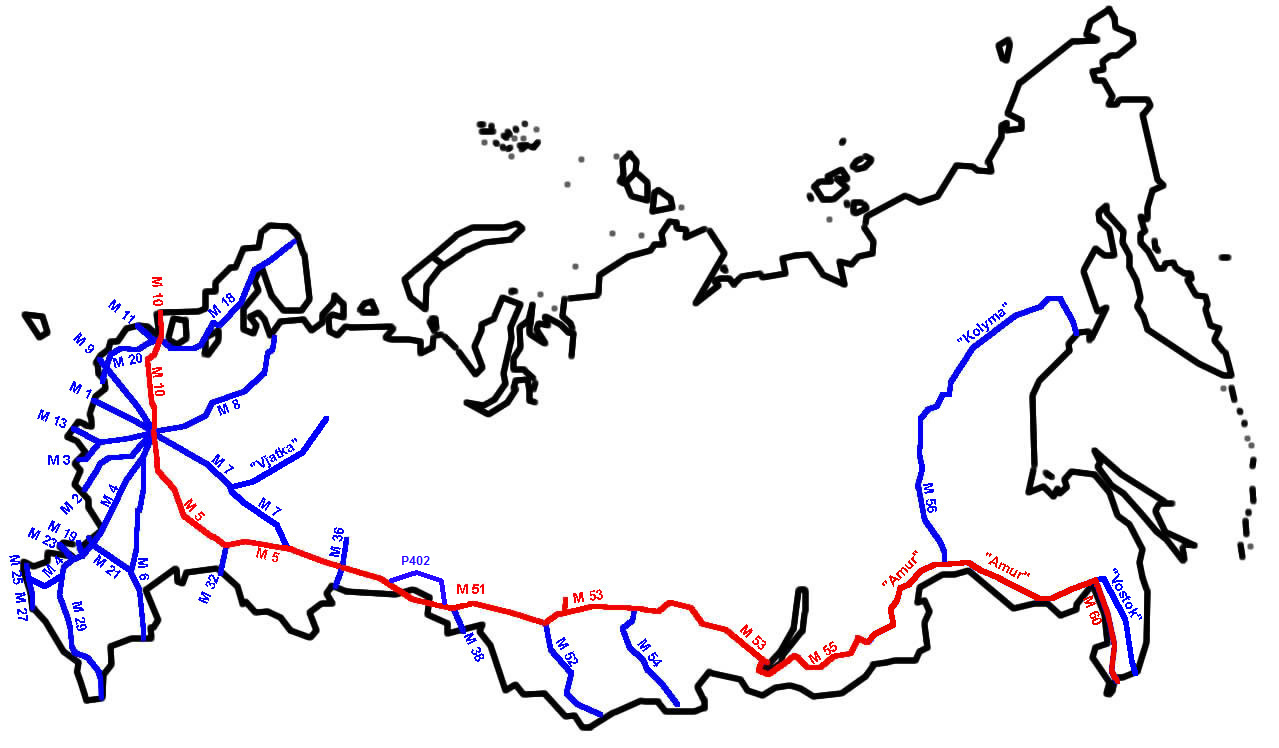
Trans-Siberian Highway 2018

By the beginning of the 18th century the number of fur-bearing animals had declined sharply across Siberia as trappers and traders collected furs without any thought for sustainable population control, and in 1913 a ban was put on sable hunting in order to keep this animal from extinction.

The Babinov Road was the first overland path across the Urals. It was established by Artemy Babinov in the late 1590s. In 1598 Verkhoturye was founded along this road as the gateway to Siberia. Road building in Siberia began in the 1730s, and from the 1760s the overland route from Yekaterinburg to Kyakhta began to replace the Siberian rivers. When the ground was frozen solid this might take 70 or 80 days. The Trans-Siberian Railway began in 1891. In the twentieth century the Trans-Siberian Highway was built, and the stretch north of the Amur was completed in 2013. The result is a pattern in which the Russians form a long narrow belt along the southern border with some extensions northward, mainly to where minerals can be found. The rivers are still used, but largely for north–south transport to and from the Trans-Siberian Railway.

== See also ==
- Siberian Route
- Age of Discovery
- Treaty of Nerchinsk
- Kyakhta trade
- List of Russian explorers
- First Kamchatka expedition
- Great Northern Expedition
- Canadian Canoe Routes (early)
