= Lozva =

- Tobol river basin
- Native name: Лӯсум-я̄ (Mansi)

Location
- Country: Russia
- Federal subject: Sverdlovsk Oblast

Physical characteristics
- Mouth: Tavda
  - coordinates: 59°32′59″N 62°20′4″E
- Length: 637 km (396 mi)
- Basin size: 17,800 km^{2} (6,900 sq mi)

Basin features
- Progression: Tavda→ Tobol→ Irtysh→ Ob→ Kara Sea

The Lozva (Russian: Лозьва; Northern Mansi: Лӯсум-я̄, Lūsum-jā) is a river in Sverdlovsk Oblast in Russia. At its confluence with the Sosva, the Tavda is formed. The river is 637 kilometres (396 mi) long, and its basin covers 17,800 square kilometres (6,900 mi^{2}). The river freezes up in October or early November and stays icebound until late April or early May. Its main tributaries are the Pynovka, Bolshaya Yevva, Ponil, and Ivdel.

In 1590 a fort was built at Lozvinsk on the river to guard the Cherdyn Route which ran over the Urals from the Vishera to the Lozva. That outpost was endangered by a Mansi chieftain from Pelym. Lozvinsk and the Cherdyn route were abandoned after 1597 when a better route, called the Babinov Road, was found through Verkhoturye. The Dyatlov Pass incident took place near the Lozva in 1959.
