= Pelym, Garinsky District, Sverdlovsk Oblast =

Former town on the bank of the Tavda River near its confluence with the Pelym River

Coordinates: 59.653°N 63.103°E

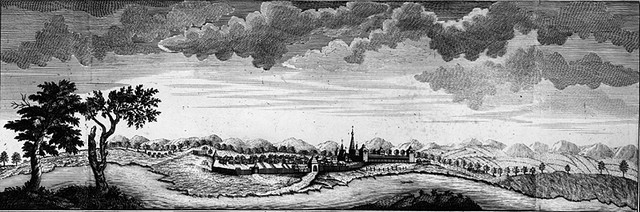
The town of Pelym in the 1700s

Pelym (Пелым) is a former town (now a village) on the bank of the Tavda River near its confluence with the Pelym River. It is part of Gari District, northeastern Sverdlovsk Oblast, Russia. In 2010, the village had 78 inhabitants.

Once considered "the gate to Siberia", Pelym owes its origin to a moving camp of Ablegirim, or Abdul Kerim, the last chieftain of the Vogul people. The Russians defeated him in an effort to pacify the Cherdyn Route, whereupon Ablegirim and his family were taken to Moscow as hostages. The fort of Pelym was built in 1592 on the site of his former residence by Prince Pyotr Gorchakov, a voivode from Cherdyn.

Pelym was one of the first Russian settlements east of the Urals, marking the eastern terminus of the Cherdyn Road from European Russia. A makeshift timber fort was brought down the river from Upper Lozva to Pelym in 1597. The builders took with them the family of Ignaty Khripunov—the first Russians to be exiled to Siberia.

After the discovery of the much shorter Babinov Road to Europe the town declined in importance. The tsarist government used it as a place of exile. The first political exiles were the people of Uglich implicated in the assassination of Tsarevich Demetrius. Other notable exiles included the paternal uncles of Tsar Michael I, Ernst Johann von Biron, and Burkhard Christoph von Münnich. Modern Pelym still has a penal colony.
