= Siberian fur trade =

Trading of animal skin

The Siberian fur trade is an exchange concerned with the gathering, buying and selling of valuable animal furs that originate from Siberia. The Siberian fur trade expanded from localized trade, and Siberian fur is now traded around the world. The Siberian fur trade had a significant impact on the development of Siberia through exploration and colonization. The fur trade also precipitated a decline in the number of fur-bearing animals and resulted in Siberia being conquered by Russia.

== Beginnings ==
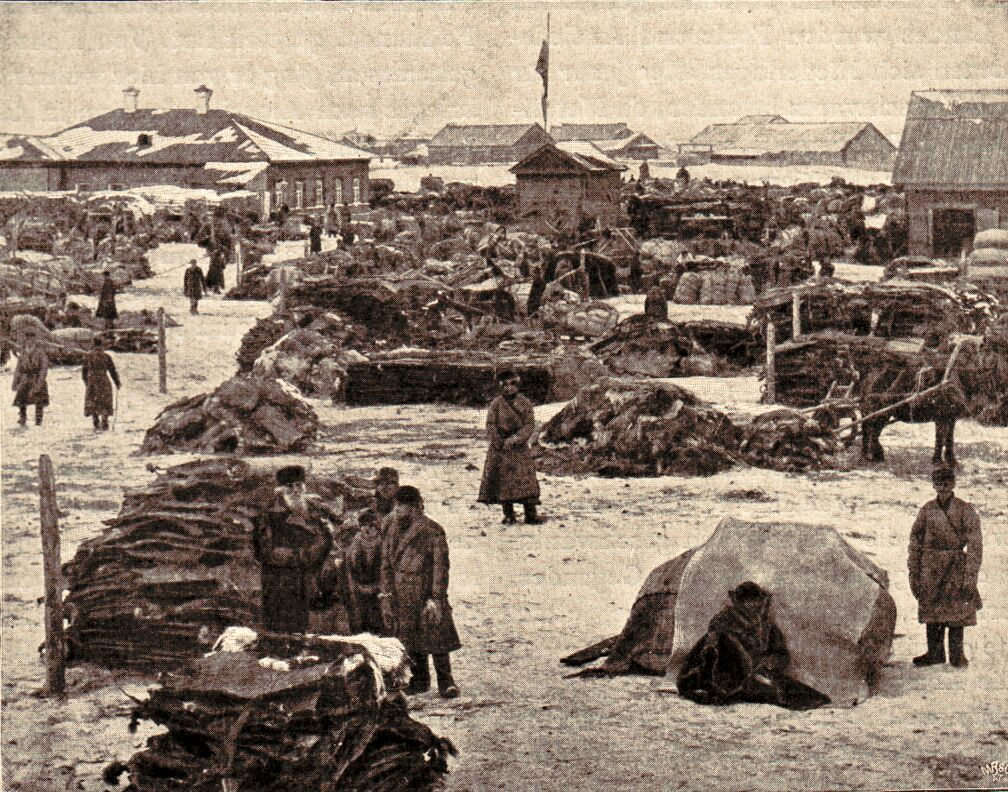
Fur market in Irbit

Traditionally, Siberians hunted as a means of sustenance and only used the fur from animals they hunted and consumed for gloves and hats. The practice of hunting animals solely for fur began after the Russians came to Siberia. Sable quickly became the most valuable and popular type of Siberian fur, and still maintains the distinction to this day.

The Siberian fur trade began in the sixteenth century, peaked in the seventeenth century, and continues to the present day. While sable has always been the most coveted fur from Siberia, the Siberian fur trade has included a large variety of animals pelts used for a variety of products, most frequently clothing. Some of the richest fur regions in Siberia are the Yakutsk, Kamchatka, and Okhotsk Peninsulas.

The Stroganov family, wealthy merchant-capitalists with extensive resources and influence in Russia, played a significant role in developing Siberia's fur trade. The Stroganovs owned several pieces of land in Siberia and made large profits trading with the natives for fur on these lands. The Stroganov family led the way to fur trading in Siberia, which became both economically and culturally important to both Russia and Siberia.

== Obtaining furs ==
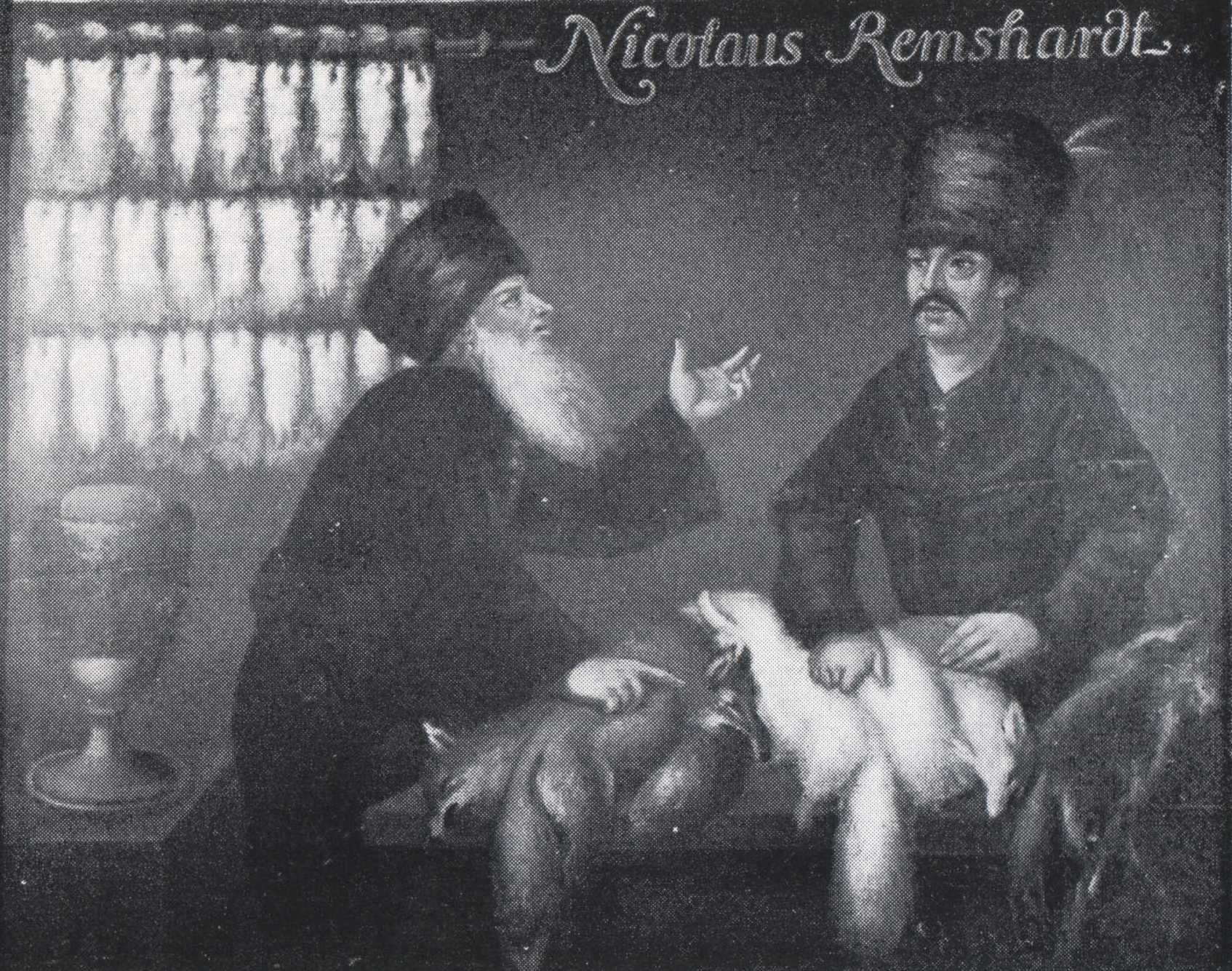
Siberian fur trader at the fair in Leipzig, Saxony (c. 1800)

Russians used several methods of acquiring the fur pelts from the Siberian furriers: yasak, purchase, confiscation, hunting expeditions, trade with natives, and in much later years, fur farming of the most valued animals. Yasak was the easiest way of collecting furs, as the furs were simply demanded as a tribute or tax from the Siberian natives. Russian explorers and hunters were not as skilled as the Siberian natives at hunting fur-bearing animals without damaging the fur, which made trading with the Siberians the second easiest way to obtain pelts. The Siberian natives knew how to kill the animals without ruining the fur.

=== Yasak (fur tribute) ===
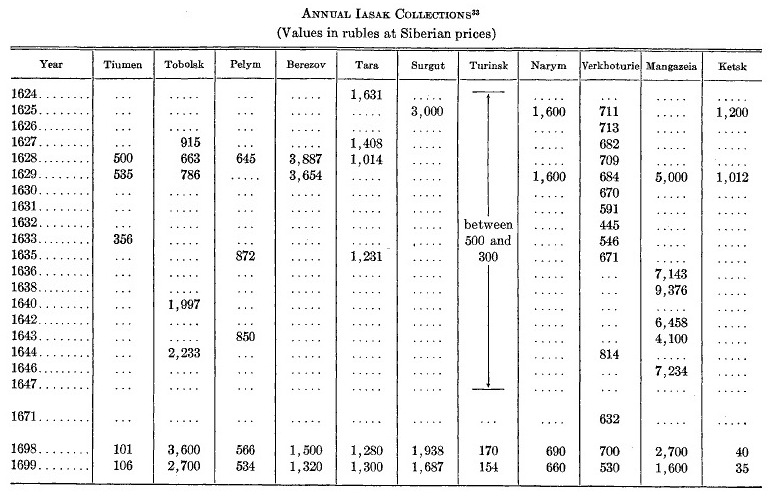
This chart shows the annual yasak collections during the seventeenth century, divided by the native peoples of Siberia.

Yasak, otherwise known as Iasak, refers to the fur tax that the natives of Siberia were forced to pay to the tsarist government of Russia. Russians would set up winter camps known as zimovya while they waited for the Siberians to hunt and pay their taxes in fur. In return, the Siberians were promised to be able to look to the Russian government for protection. If a native tribe, community, or individual did not comply to the tax or otherwise resisted, they would face government-backed Cossack raids.

Yasak could be levied on an individual, a tribe, or both. All men between the ages of eighteen and fifty years were subject to this tax. The type of fur and the amount of fur pelts required for this tax varied, depending on how available the pelts were. For example, in the beginning of the 17th century, yasak could be anywhere from five to twenty-two sables per man, but this dropped to three sable pelts by the mid-1600s due to decreases in the sable population. In 1601, Russian tax collectors in the Verkhoturye district collected about ten sables a year from every married man and five sables a year from every bachelor. Officials collecting the yasak tribute also demanded extra furs as "gifts". Fox, squirrel, and ermine pelts were also accepted as yasuk after sable populations began to decline due to overhunting. Instead of one sable pelt, the following was accepted as its equivalent: one fox, glutton (relative of the marten), or otter pelt; two blue-fox pelts; sixteen polar-fox pelts; or one hundred squirrel pelts. The Russian government decided the amount of other pelts that were equivalent to the sable pelt.

Within forty years, almost all Siberian natives were forced into paying fur tribute to the Russians. Russian traders, hunters, and explorers reached the Pacific coastline by 1650 and were collecting fur tribute from most natives along the coast.

=== Hunting and trading with natives ===
Beyond the yasuk, the Russians had two principal ways of obtaining Siberian furs: through hunting the animals themselves or through trading. Promyshlenniki was the Russian name for the small groups of Russian traders and trappers who took part in the Siberian fur trade. They were free-men who used fur trapping as a way of making a living. They worked together as a group making traps, collecting food and drink, and building camps in the harsh climate. These groups would evenly split the fur caught between all the members of the group. Working in groups gave these trappers protection against harsh Siberian winters, against unexpected attacks, and other dangers they could encounter if they were alone. At the peak of the Siberia fur trade during the seventeenth century, over a thousand of these trappers and traders ventured into Siberia each year. Men were infected with "fur fever," wanting to strike it rich like the Stroganovs.

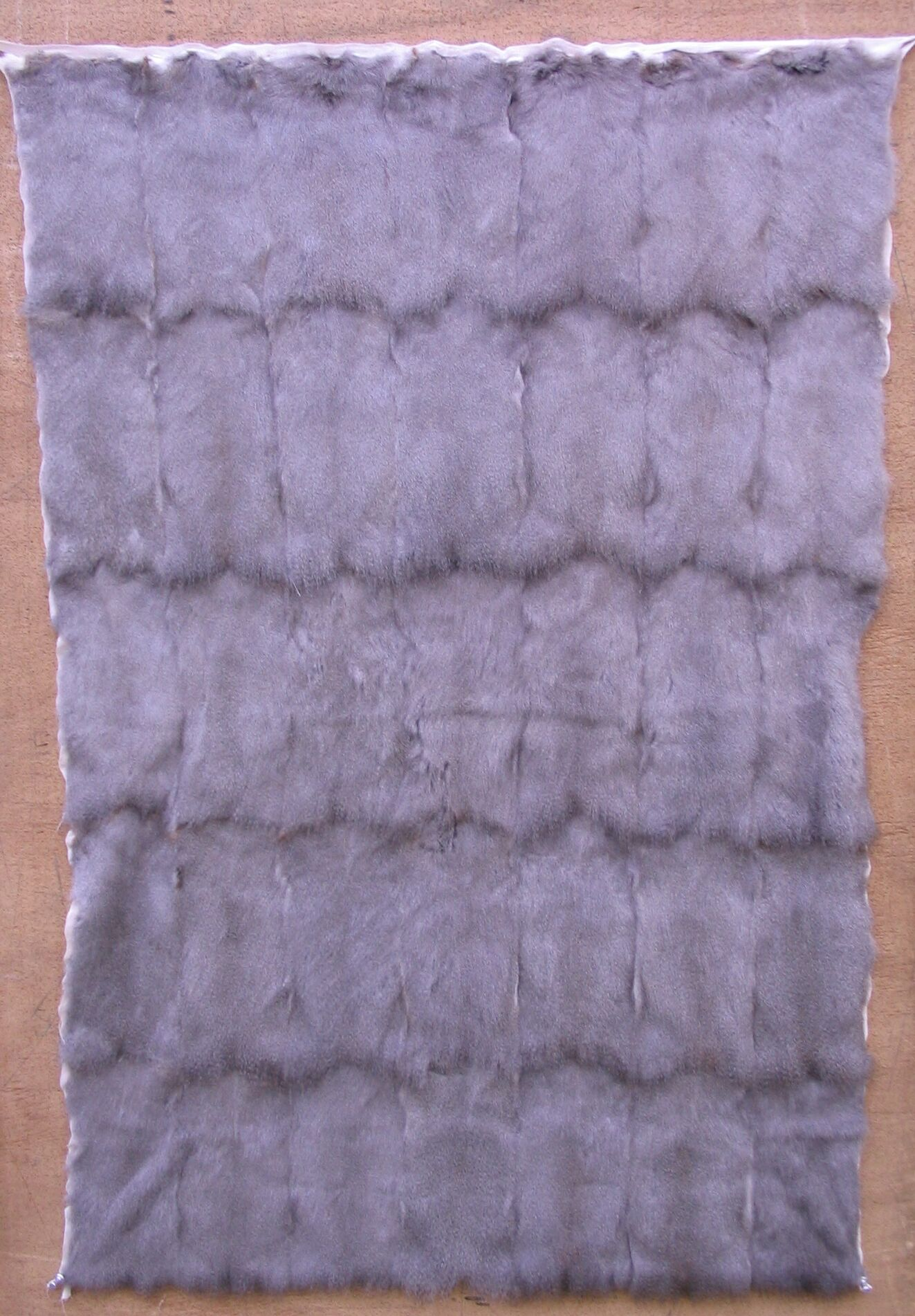
Plate of squirrel fur backs

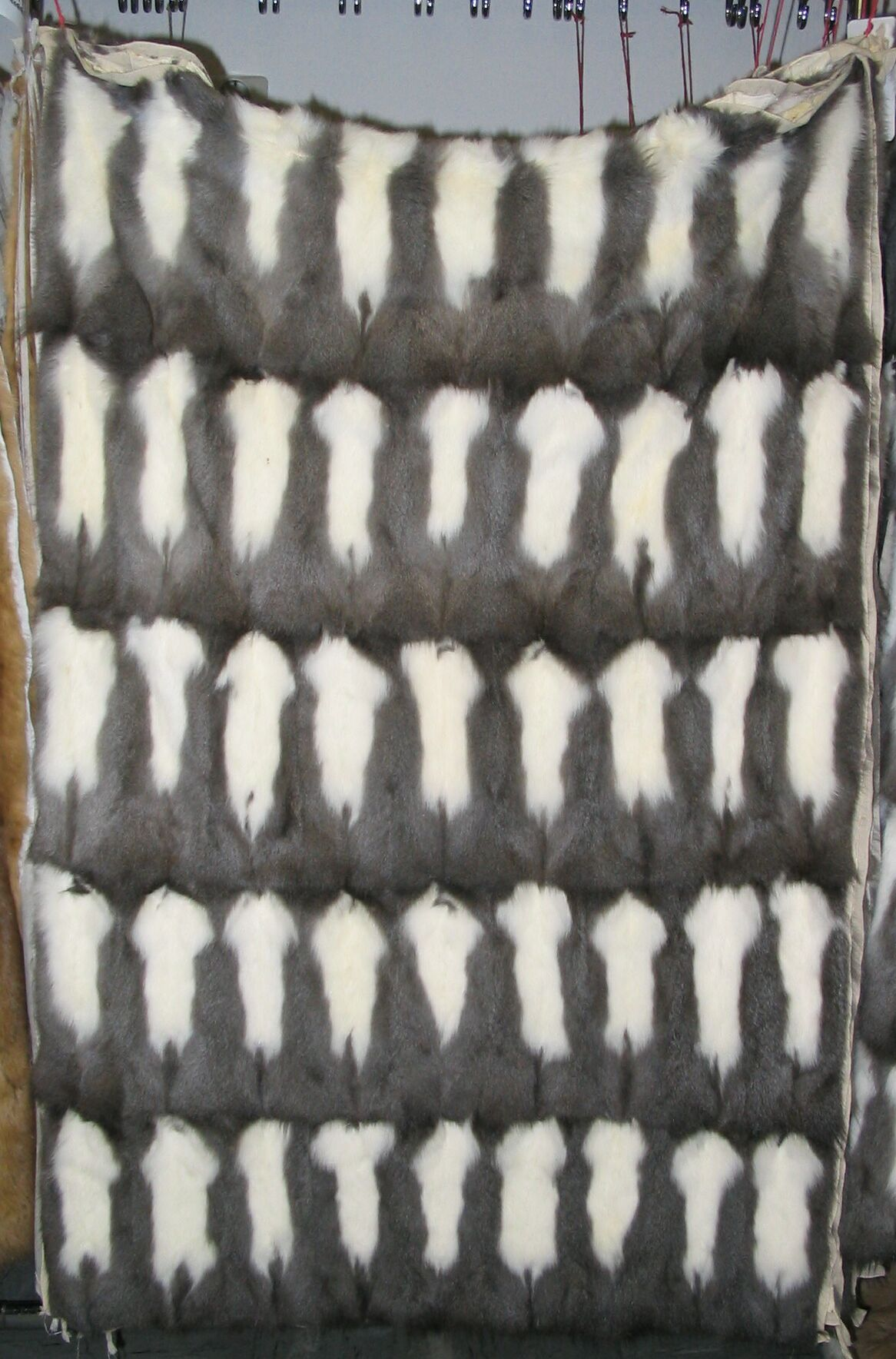
Squirrel fur bellies

The Siberian fur trade was composed of two main types of traders. Small groups of traders braved the dangers of Siberia's taiga wilderness to trade with natives themselves, but many more traders stayed in Russia and sent agents to work for them in Siberia. Both the independent traders and the agents of the traders in Russia would stay in Siberia typically anywhere from two to six years, depending on how far they wanted to travel, their luck at trading with natives and trapping the animals, and the harshness of the weather. The most commonly traded items included Russian-made goods such as metal wares and ironworks, hunting equipment and firearms, and food and drink supplies. For most of the natives, hunting equipment and metal products were the most useful and coveted trade items.

There was no oversight or rules for the traders who participated in the Siberian fur trade, especially in the first few centuries of fur trading. The native Siberians did not have much knowledge of the worth of their furs, and Russian traders commonly took advantage of this ignorance. For example, names would commonly pay for one copper kettle with the amount of sable pelts that would fit inside of the pot, a tiny fraction of the pelts' actual worth. Traders frequently used force and terror tactics to collect additional furs from the natives. For example, one report from Okhotosk told of a trader who kidnapped all the children from the local native Tungus so he could sell them back to their parents for a sable pelt apiece. In some cases, the traders would hold the native women and children as hostages (amanat) and in doing so they would force the fathers, brothers, and husbands to bring them furs in return for their loved ones’ safety.

The fur hunting expeditions into Siberia were mostly conducted in groups ranging from six to sixty men based at small winter peasant huts in the Siberian taiga. The groups baited pit traps with fish or meat to catch sable, and tracked other prey with nets and dogs. They would usually spend up to six or seven weeks at a time hunting. While hunting on land, they would usually use a dog team trained to smell and hunt animals, particularly sable. The dogs were trained not to kill the animals; hunters feared that the dogs would destroy the precious fur by tearing it to pieces. The hunters also occasionally used dogs to retrieve animals once they were killed. Hunters typically killed the animals themselves, doing their best not to damage the pelts in the process.

Hunters utilized bows, traps, snares, and nets to catch and kill animals for their pelts. Hunters would also follow the footprints of the animals to their dwellings and catch the animals as they emerged. Water mammals, such as sea otters, were also hunted for their pelts. Hunters would balance on small kayaks and would throw spears to kill the water animals. This skill was commonly passed down from father to son and taught at a young age.

Few Russian hunters were as skilled as the Siberian natives at killing animals without damage to the pelts, which made trading the superior method of acquiring these pelts. Hunting was also dangerous for the participants - hunters faced the possibility of disease, accidents, injury from animals, or violent confrontations with the indigenous peoples of Siberia when hunting fur-bearing animals. Under the best conditions, the hunting and trading parties exploring Siberia had a mere seven months after the spring thaw before the Siberian winter drove the animals into winter shelters, which stopped hunting for the season. Early routes taken by fur traders followed the large rivers in Siberia, as the furs were easier to transport over water than land. These rivers connected the major fur gathering centers and provided for relatively quick transport between them. The fur pelts were tied between two boards for transport along these rivers, and were thus called "timbers".

By the twentieth century, prime fur-bearing animals were raised on farms. However, the most valuable pelts still come from the wilderness, because the farm-raised animals were believed to not have as luxurious pelts. The wild animal furs are the most valuable because the harsh climates forced the animals to naturally grow thick warm fur, whereas the ones grown in farms do not need to grow such thick fur for protection from the harsh climate.

== Sable ==
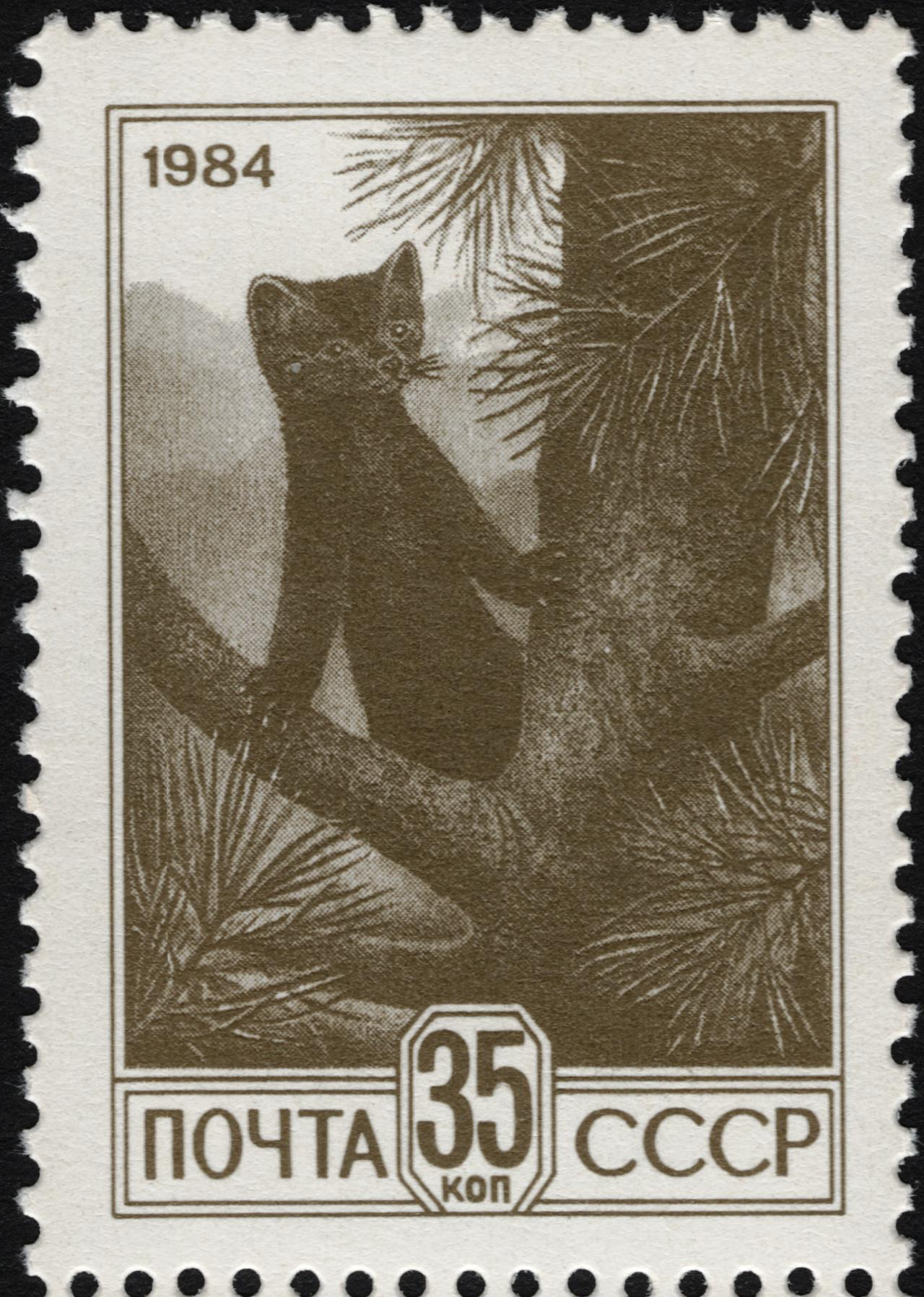
A Siberian sable depicted on a 35 kopeck stamp

Sables were the first fur-bearing animals in Siberia to interest Russians. Sables were known as the "Golden Fleece" because they of their extreme value, both on the local and the world markets. A fur clothing store describes the sable fur as follows: "It is difficult to describe Russian sable fur in words: almost weightless, silky, satin like, lustrous, sparkling, glistening, incredibly beautiful. In addition it is very warm and durable."

Sable continues to be the world's most valuable fur. The most sought-after sable furs in the world come from the Barguzin region of Siberia. The sable is a small mammal resembling a mix between a weasel and a cat. It feeds on pine nuts, mice, and squirrels and hunts mostly at night. The sable fur surpasses all other types of fur due to its silky dense texture and luminous shades of beige, brown, gold, silver, and black. The darkest shades of sable fur are the most valuable. Next to sable, Siberian fox furs and squirrel pelts are the most valued furs from the region.

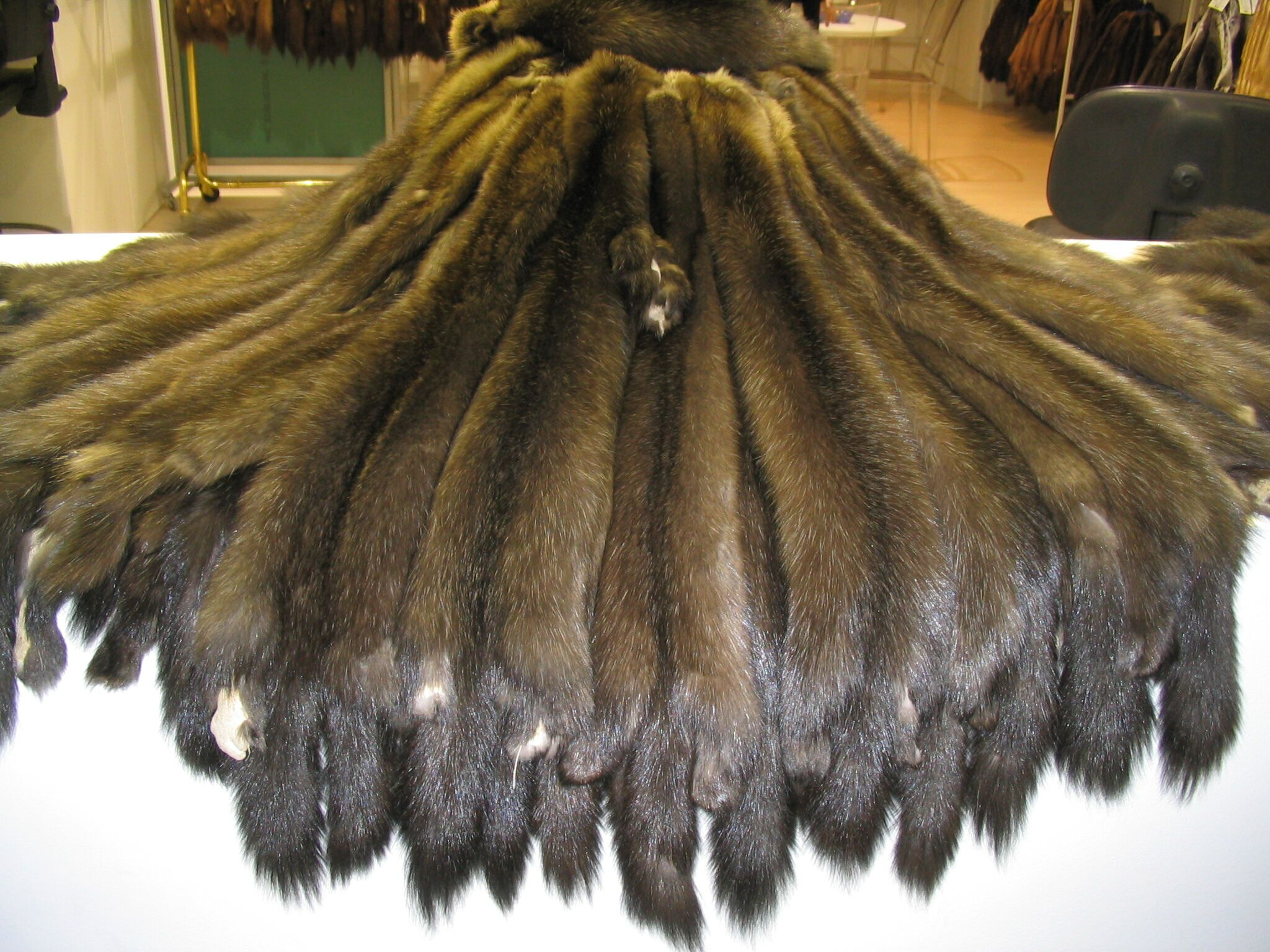
Bargusinski fur skins (best sort), tanned

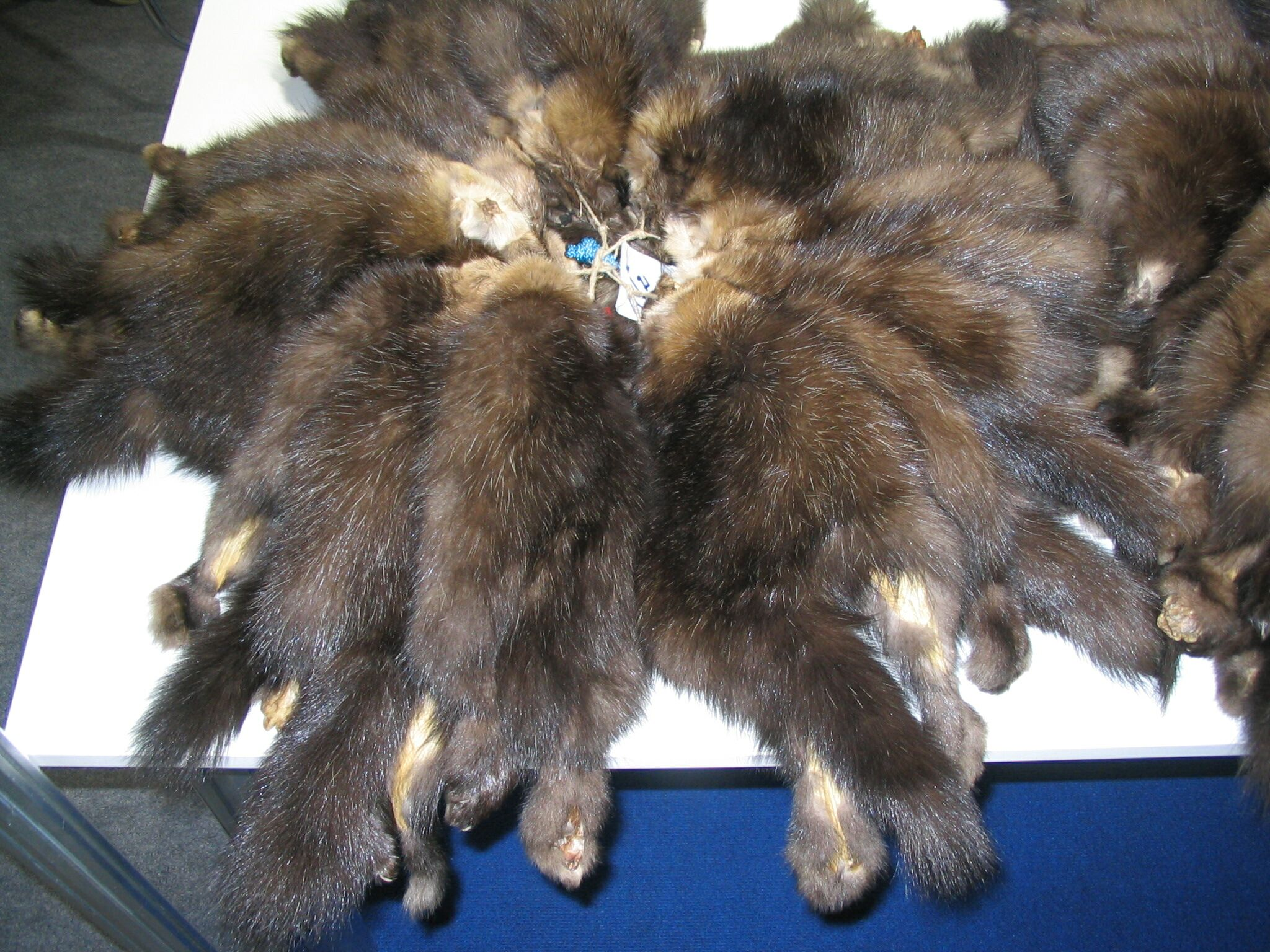
Raw Bargusinski skins

In addition to sable, black and white fox, ermine, beaver, squirrel, lynx, wolf, wolverine, rabbit, marten, walrus, sea otter, and polar bear were also hunted for their pelts. Most of these fur bearing animals are found in the Siberian taiga, except for the sea otters and walrus that were found on the North Pacific coasts. In more recent times, fur farming has been used to breed animals for their fur. Silver fox farms were started in 1936, mostly in Yakutia. These farms eliminated some of the dangers and uncertainties involved with hunting in the wilderness.

This trade of valuable fur-bearing animals from Siberia has a definite impact on the world fur trading industry. In 1910, the pelts of seventy thousand sables, ten times that many ermine, five million rabbits, and fifteen million squirrels from Siberia accounted for almost half the world's furs. Today, the most valuable furs still come from Siberia.

== Profits ==
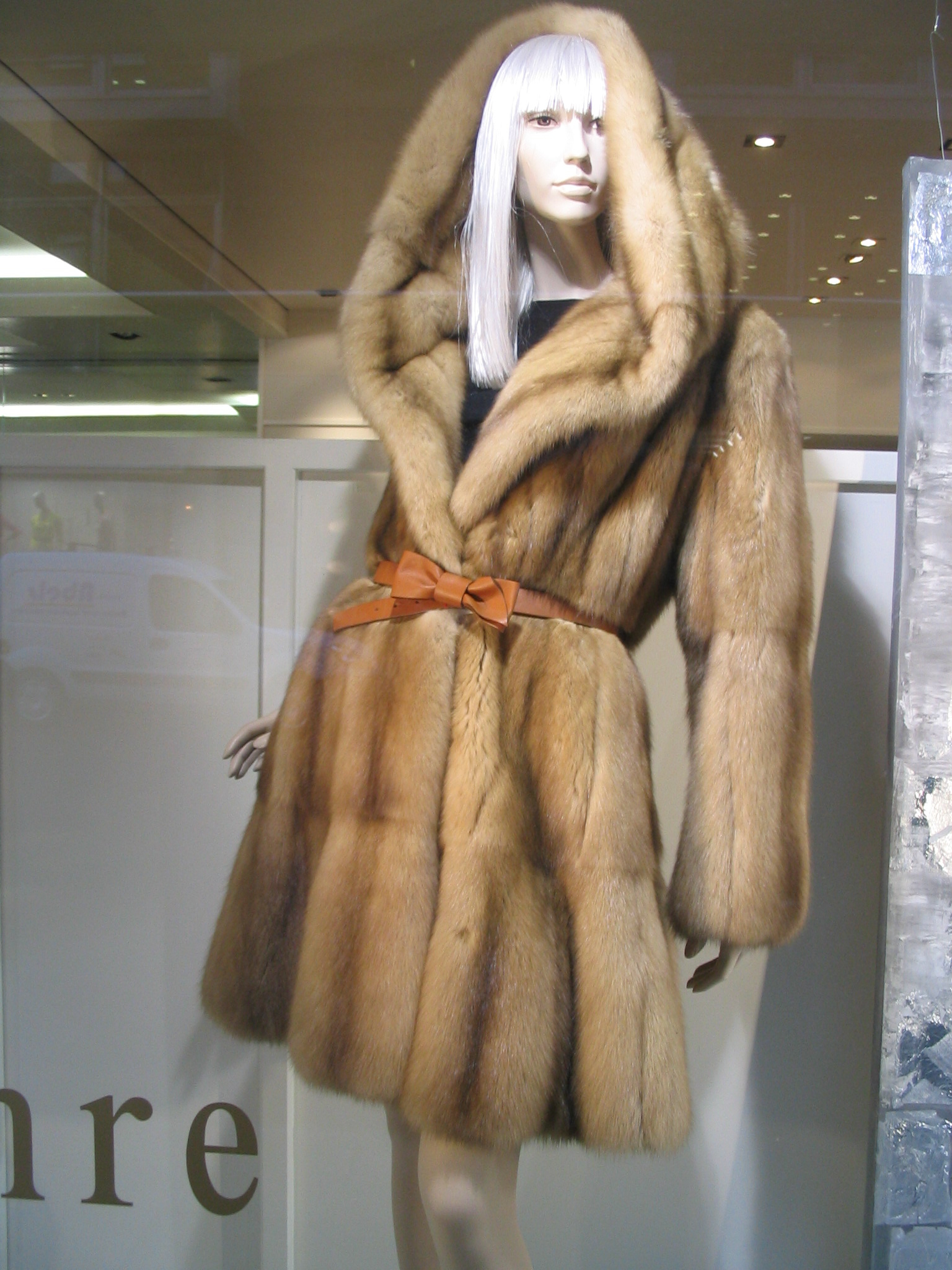
Coat of Russian sables

The monetary profits from the Siberian fur trade were enormous; Siberian furs were known as "soft gold" because their value is comparable to actual gold. Altogether, the Siberian fur industry was worth around $62 million a year in 1992.

In the 16th century, a prime sable pelt sold for ten times what a peasant family could earn in a year, and a black fox fetched up to ten times the price of sable. Private traders sold roughly 350,000 rubles' worth of Siberian furs annually during the seventeenth century. In comparison, a peasant family of four earned less than one ruble a year from forty acres of good farmland. A few good fox pelts in 1623 could buy fifty acres of land, a decent cabin, five horses, ten head of cattle, twenty sheep, and still have capital left over. In the 1990s, white ermine pelts were worth 16 rubles, squirrel pelts were worth 5 rubles, and sable pelts were worth 150 rubles. These furs have even historically been used as currency, and fur-lined cloaks and hats were a signature of Russian royalty.

At the peak of the fur trade in the middle of the seventeenth century, Siberian furs accounted for more than ten percent of Russia's total revenue. The government of Russia set the price for furs in Siberia, and kept the price of furs artificially low in order to make a larger profit on furs sold abroad. All local furs were sold to the state fur company in Irkutsk or Tobolsk, two of the largest fur trading centers in Siberia. A first-grade fox pelt was sold the state trading center in Irkutsk for 108 rubles – approximately $18 in 1990. That same fur was then sold in Anchorage, Alaska for over $150, or about 4,779 rubles.

Today, fur clothing is still a sign of wealth around the world, and the prices for prime fur clothing continue to rise. The sable coat, in particular, is a symbol of status and is one of the most coveted types of fur coats. There are American and Canadian versions of the sable coat, but the Russian version is the most valuable. Prices for the full-length Siberian sable fur coat today can cost around $100,000 or 3,185,850 rubles. They are sold in many major cities around the world like Paris, Milan, and New York.

== Trading partners ==
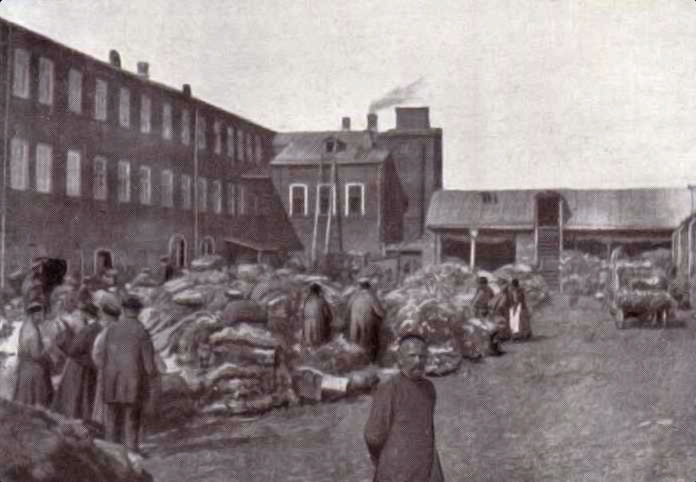
Fur market in Nizhny Novgorod

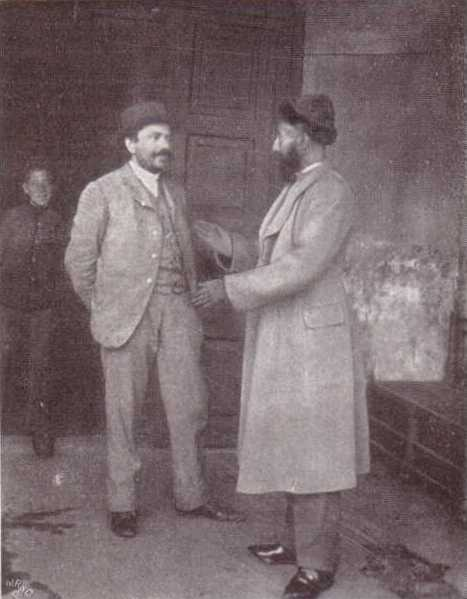
Fur traders in Nizhny Novgorod

Siberian fur quickly became very popular around the world very soon after the Siberian fur trade began in the sixteenth century. Most of the Siberian fur trade in the first few centuries was controlled by Russian explorers and traders. Trade connections also existed between Siberia and other European and Asian territories. There was a great demand for fur in Byzantium and Western Europe.

Furs were also traded to China and Persia. In exchange, Siberian fur traders obtained silks and other luxury goods from those places. These goods were not common to Siberia, and thus were in high demand. Siberian furs sold to China were a huge source of revenue during the eighteenth century, as furs sold in China for up to ten times more than they would locally. Chinese buyers purchased more than seven million Siberian fur pelts a year. The Chinese preferred squirrel furs for its warmth, durability, and relatively low cost. These furs became very popular in the Chinese winter clothing lines.

Trade connections were also made between Siberia and Bukhara, Khiva, and other significant trade centers in the Islamic regions of Central Asia. Bukharan merchants frequently came to Siberian towns in search of furs.

As the Russians traveled across the Pacific, North Americans were brought into the fur trade. Siberian furs were brought to Alaska and traded there. Indirectly, this allowed Siberia to also become connected with the Western Hemisphere and the Americas.

In the present world, Siberian furs are still extremely popular in international fur trade. Furs from the northern Siberian tundra are frequently found in international fur auctions around the world and carry high prices at auction. The Siberian fur trade has major trade connections in Europe, Asia, and the Americas. Trappers still hunt for fur and the sable is still the most important of fur bearing animals. Many Siberian indigenous peoples are totally dependent on trapping as a living° Willerslev 2015.

== Benefits ==
The fur trade was socially, economically, and also physically beneficial to Siberia. The fur traders brought new people to Siberia in search of furs, and these trappers, traders and explorers would connect with the natives. For example, Russian men brought to Siberia for the fur trade would often meet and marry native women there. Men who settled in Siberia helped the Siberian population grow and diversify, as these men would bring their Russian culture and skills to Siberia. Siberians also benefited by their furs being the most coveted furs in the world. As the Siberian fur became popular, Siberia began to be considered more of an area filled with valuable natural resources, rather than a desolate wasteland. Finally, the fur trade brought in products that are not common in Siberia. Such as weapons, metal workings, and exotic silks and spices.

The Siberian fur trade encouraged exploration and colonization of the Siberian landmass. Hunters would travel across the tundras, taigas, and forests in search of animals, where they built camps and forts. This exploration and camp building began the development and modernization of Siberia. Russians expanded into Siberia rapidly, driven by the promise of fast fortunes through the fur trade. Hunters and trappers and traders flocked into Siberia in a "Fur Rush" similar to the Gold Rush of California and Alaska in the United States. The urbanization of several major Siberian cities can be directly traced to the revenues and profits of the Siberian fur trade. The cities of Tobolsk, Tomsk, and Irkutsk became Siberia's leading urban centers, due primarily to revenue brought in by the fur trade.

Siberian fur also became a large part of Russian culture. For example, Soviet Olympic teams wore furs at the Olympic games as part of their uniforms.

== Consequences ==
The Siberian fur trade was not completely advantageous and had several direct negative consequences for Siberia. By the beginning of the 18th century, there was a sharp decline in the number of fur-bearing animals across Siberia as trappers and traders collected furs without any thought for population control. Hunters would hunt in an area until the animal population was decimated and then move on to another hunting ground. In 1913 a ban was put on sable hunting in order to keep this animal from extinction.

Many animals have been killed for the Siberian fur trade, which has had severe negative effects on Siberian ecology. In the middle of the nineteenth century, about 10-15 million squirrels were killed in Siberia each year, in addition to tens of thousands of ermines, rabbits, martens, foxes, sables, lynx and wolverine. Most of these animals are small and a single jacket requires many pelts. For example, several hundred squirrel pelts are needed to make one fur cloak. In Irkutsk, a major fur trade center, more than 150,000 sable pelts, thousands of Arctic foxes, and hundreds of thousands of squirrels passed through its customs house each year. Hunters also came to Siberia with the false image of Siberia as an endless wilderness that could not be exhausted, and they hunted and killed without regard to maintaining the animal populations.

== Fur products ==
Siberian furs have been used to make a wide range of products, with fur clothing being the most common. Clothing made from Siberian fur includes different length coats, hats, gloves, shawls, and boots.

The most popular fur item sold throughout the world is the fur coat. The Siberian fur coats range in length from mid-length to full length, falling either to the knees or to the floor. Fur coats can be made of almost any type of fur, but the most valued are the furs that are soft and will flow gently around the body. For example, reindeer fur is not usually used for coats because it tends to get stiff and rigid in the cold.

The Siberian sable coats are the most expensive fur clothing. They come in seven different shades depending on which region of Siberia the fur is taken from and what season the sables were hunted. The high head fur of the sable has the darkest color, a dark blue-ish black that is the most expensive type of sable fur. The normal head coloring has blackish brown to dark blue fur. Most sable fur is light chestnut blue at the roots and yellow sand at the ends. Barguzinskiy sable coats sell for around $80,000 (about 2,550,280 rubles).

The Siberian squirrel coats are also extremely popular in modern world markets. The blue-grey pelts are considered to be the best type of squirrel fur. They are soft and light weight, but this type of fur is also fragile. Siberian squirrel coats are less expensive than sable coats, though prices depend on quality and color.

Fitch and corsac furs are used for coats, and the best quality fitch fur comes from Siberia. The fitch, or European polecat, is the species from which ferrets were domesticated, and the corsac is a type of fox that is also found in Siberia. However, these furs are less popular because foxes are common to virtually every fur-trading country in the world.

The Siberian ushanka is a full fur hat, consisting entirely of warm fur. It is commonly made out of black foxes, red foxes, silver foxes, shadow foxes, blue fox fur, brown foxes, raccoons, martens, or black beavers. It covers the top of the head and comes down to also cover the ears and back of the head. This is the warmest fur hat available in the world market. The prices depend on the type and quality of fur, but can cost up to $650.00 (about 20,721 rubles).

Fur boots are also in cold climates. Reindeer fur boots are popular in both Siberia and around the world. Like most of Siberia's fur products, these boots can be extremely expensive. These boots range from a starting cost of $330–$400 (about 10,00-12,00 rubles) to a maximum of about $630 (about 20,000 rubles). These are a reindeer fur version of the Russian valenki boot. Fur boots can also be made out of variety of different furs, but reindeer is the most popular because of its insulating properties. Other furs, such as sable, are considered too luxurious and beautiful to be wasted on footwear.

Siberian fur gloves can also be made with a variety of different furs. The most common types of fur used for this product are fox fur, raccoon, coyote, and rabbit, chosen for their softness and warmth. The prices can range from $59.95 (about 1911 rubles) to $449.95 (14,344 rubles) depending on the product and amount of fur included.

== See also ==
- North American fur trade

== Bibliography ==
- Bryant, Peter J. (2002). "Chapter 5: Extinction and Depletion from Overexploitation". Biodiversity and Conservation: A Hypertext Book. School of Biological Sciences, University of California, Irvine.
- Bobrick, Benson (1992). East of the Sun: The Epic Conquest and Tragic History of Siberia. Poseidon Press. ISBN 978-0-671-66755-9.
- Brumfield, William (11 August 2011). "Usolye: Stroganov outpost in the Urals". Russia Beyond the Headlines.
- Bychkov, Oleg V.; Jacobs, Mina A. (1994). "Russian Hunters in Eastern Siberia in the Seventeenth Century: Lifestyle and Economy". Arctic Anthropology. 31 (1): 75–80. JSTOR 40316350.
- Cutler, B. S. (1918). Commerce Reports: United States. Bureau of Foreign and Domestic. Washington D.C.: Government Printing Office.
- Fisher, Raymond Henry (1943). The Russian Fur Trade, 1550-1700. University of California Press. GGKEY:1KU09ZX7DX9.
- Forsyth, James (1992). A History of the Peoples of Siberia: Russia's North Asian Colony 1581-1990. Cambridge University Press. ISBN 978-0-521-47771-0.
- Fur Trade: Russia. Answers.com <http://www.answers.com/topic/fur-trade-russia>
- Gibson, James R. (1980). "Russian Expansion in Siberia and America". Geographical Review. 70 (2). American Geographical Society: 127–136. Bibcode:1980GeoRv..70..127G. doi:10.2307/214435. JSTOR 214435.
- Kerttula, Anna M. (2000). Antler on the Sea: The Yup'ik and Chukchi of the Russian Far East. Cornell University Press. ISBN 0-8014-8685-8.
- Lincoln, W. Bruce (1994). The Conquest of a Continent: Siberia and the Russians. Cornell University Press. ISBN 0-8014-8922-9.
- Miller, Gwenn A. (January 2005). "Russian Routes: Kamchatka to Kodiak Island". Common-Place: The Interactive Journal of Early American Life. Vol. 5, no. 2.
- Rethmann, Petra (2001). Tundra Passages: History and Gender in the Russian Far East. University Park: Pennsylvania State University Press. ISBN 0-271-04358-X.
- "Sable Coat is King." The Haute Women's Fur Clothing Boutique. 14 May 2009. Web. 16 January 2012. < http://www.luxfurclothing.com/blog/?cat=11>
- "Sable Fur." Fur Coats Information. FurCoats.info, 2005. Web. 16 January 2012. <http://furcoats.info/sable_fur.html>.
- Shinkarev, Leonid Iosifovich (1973). The Land Beyond the Mountains: Siberia and Its People Today. New York: Macmillan. ISBN 978-0-0261-0520-0.
- "Siberian Chapka Ushanka." Russian Fur Hat, Chapka. Arctic-Store, LLC. 2011. Web. 16 January 2012. <http://www.arctic-store.com/russian-fur-hat-chapka/siberian-chapka-shapka-ushanka.html?p=2>
- St. George, George (1969). Siberia: The New Frontier. D. McKay Company.
- Swenson, Olaf. Northwest of the World. Binghamton: Dodd, Mead, and Company, Inc, 1944.
- Tyler, Patrick E. (27 December 2000). "Behind the $100,000 Sable Coat, a Siberian Hunter". The New York Times.
- Vitebsky, Piers (2006). The Reindeer People: Living with Animals and Spirits in Siberia. Houghton Mifflin Harcourt. ISBN 0-618-77357-6.
- "Womens Winter Gloves & Mittens." FurHatWorld.com 2012. Web. 16 January 2012. <http://www.furhatworld.com/womens-winter-gloves-c-41_77.html>
- "Yakutsk: Journey to the Coldest City on Earth." The Independent. 21 January 2008.
- Web. 16 January 2012. <https://www.independent.co.uk/travel/europe/yakutsk-journey-to-the-coldest-city-on-earth-771503.html>
- Willerslev, Rane. On the Run in Siberia. Minneapolis: University of Minnesota Press, 2015.
