= Tea Road =

The Tea Road may refer to:

- The Tea Horse Road starting in Yunnan province, China, and leading into Burma and Tibet
- The Siberian Route over which large quantities of tea were transported from China to Europe
