= Church of Our Lady of the Sign, Verkhoturye =

Orthodox church in Sverdlovsk Oblast, Russia

Church of Our Lady of the Sign
- Церковь Знамения Божией Матери
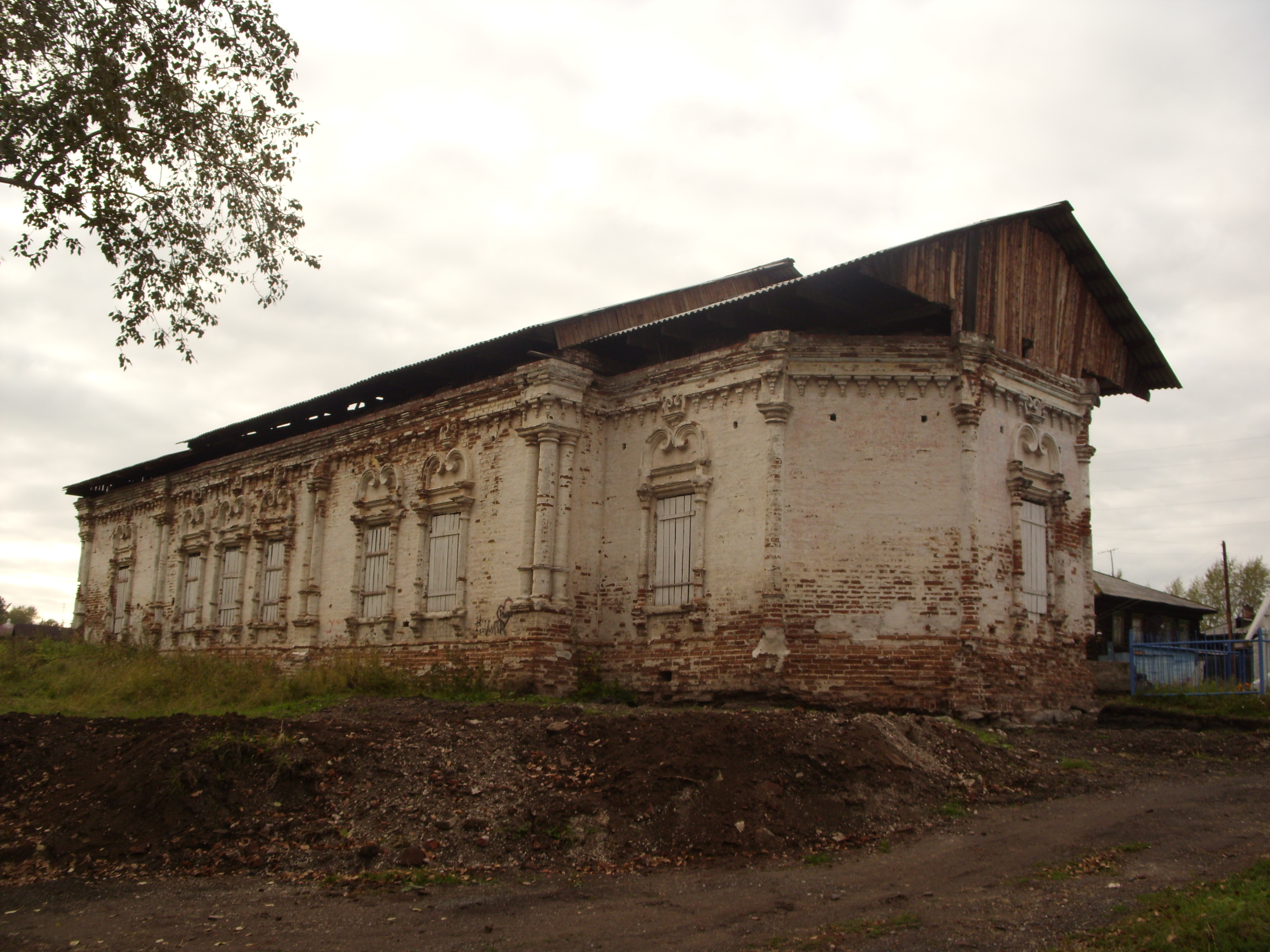
- Interactive map of the Church of Our Lady of the Sign area

General information
- Location: Verkhoturye
- Coordinates: 58°51′46″N 60°48′07″E
- Construction started: 1778
- Completed: 1781

Church of Our Lady of the Sign - is an Orthodox church in Verkhoturye, Sverdlovsk oblast.

The building was granted the status of regional significance on 31 December 1987 (decision No. 535 by the executive committee of Sverdlovsk oblast Council of People's Deputies). The object number of cultural heritage of regional significance is 661410161840005.

== History ==
The first building of the temple was wooden and destroyed by fire in 1778. Soon the construction of a new capital stone two-story building began. November 6, 1781, the lower church was consecrated in honor of the icon of the Most Holy Theotokos "The Sign". On the lower tier there was a semicircular three-tiered iconostasis. On May 11, 1808, the upper church was consecrated in the name of the martyrs of Flora and Laurus. On the upper tier there was a four-cestal iconostasis with the image of God the Father.

The parish included the villages of Furina, Kamenka, Shvedova and Nekhoroshka (there was a wooden chapel). The number of parishioners is slightly more than 600.

In 1922, the property of the church was confiscated: "3 poods 11 pounds 38 silver spools" (53.5 kilograms). The building was closed in 1935. The dome and bell tower are demolished. Currently not working.

== Architecture ==
A monument to the temple architecture of the late XVIII century. A rare example of the use of clypeus with characteristic spiral curls. It belongs to the number of key urban dominants, forms its coastal panorama. It is placed with an indent from the red line of Sverdlov Street on the slope of the bank of the Tura River.

To the longitudinally extended volume with the temple, the refectory and the sub-consigned space adjoins a narrowed pentahedral apse.

Members of the facades are formed by columns and a relaxed entablature. The partitions are cut by arched windows in clypees with twin spiral curls. Some of the windows have been replaced by blind walls. The southern part of the temple is marked by double three-quarter columns, placed on pedestals and carrying an entablement. The protrusions of the liberated parts are full three-tiered, in the span are devoid of a tier of architrave. Under the frieze a row of curly denticles was launched. The wall of the wall is cut by windows in two axes.

Through the opening in the order portal with twin curls, the entrance from the west to the collapsed room and then to the square refectory with a blind northern wall. The refectory is covered with a semi-vault arch with three decks above the southern windows. The temple stretched from the north to the south is communicated through wide arches with a refectory.

== Literature ==
- Свод памятников истории и культуры Свердловской области. Vol. 2. Екатеринбург: Сократ. 2008. p. 648. ISBN 978-5-88664-323-7 – via ред. В.Е.Звагельская.
- Бурлакова Н.Н. (2011). Забытые храмы Свердловской области. Екатеринбург: Сократ. pp. 128–129. ISBN 978-5-88664-395-4.
- Приходы и церкви Екатеринбургской епархии. Екатеринбург: Братство Св. Праведного Симеона Верхотурского Чудотворца. 1902. p. 647.
