= Siberian Route =

Road in Russia

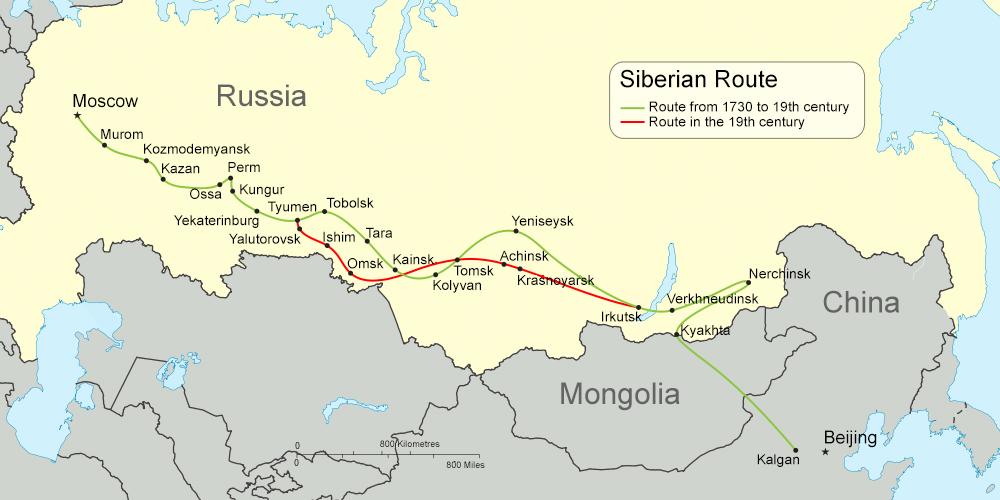
The map of the Siberian route in the 18th century (green) and the early 19th century (red).

The Siberian Route (Russian: Сибирский тракт, romanized: Sibirsky trakt), also known as the Moscow Highway (Московский тракт, Moskovsky trakt) and Great Highway (Большой тракт, Bolshoi trakt), was a historic route that connected European Russia to Siberia and China.

== History ==
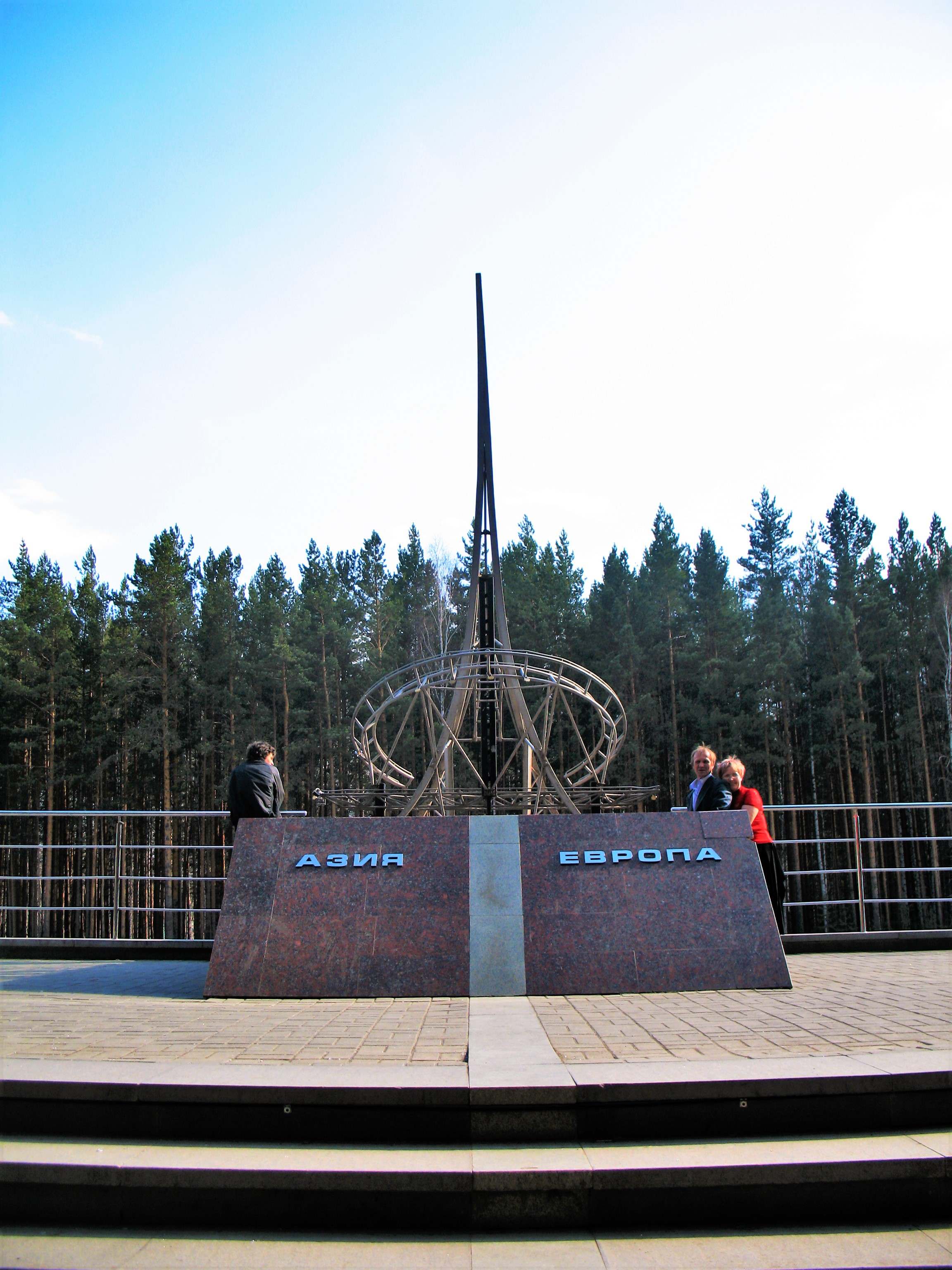
Monument marking the dividing line between Asia and Europe on the Siberian Route coordinate:56°49′55.7″N 60°21′02.60″E

The construction of the road was decreed by the Tsar and was not finished until the mid-19th century. Previously, Siberian transport had been mostly by river via Siberian River Routes. The first Russian settlers arrived in Siberia by the Cherdyn river route which was superseded by the Babinov overland route in the late 1590s. The town of Verkhoturye in the Urals was the most eastern point of the Babinov Road.

The much longer Siberian route started in Moscow as the Vladimir Highway and passed through Murom, Kozmodemyansk, Kazan, Perm, Kungur, Yekaterinburg, Tyumen, Tobolsk, Tara, Kainsk, Tomsk, Yeniseysk and Irkutsk. After crossing Lake Baikal the road split near Verkhneudinsk. One branch continued east to Nerchinsk while the other went south to the border post of Kyakhta where it linked to camel caravans that crossed Mongolia to a Great Wall gate at Kalgan.

The Siberian route to China was followed in the early 18th century by a Swede, Lorenz Lange, and two Scots, Thomas Garvine and John Bell.

In the early 19th century, the route was moved to the south. From Tyumen the road proceeded through Yalutorovsk, Ishim, Omsk, Tomsk, Achinsk and Krasnoyarsk before rejoining the older route at Irkutsk. It remained a vital artery connecting Siberia with Moscow and Europe until the last decades of the 19th century, when it was superseded by the Trans-Siberian Railway and Amur Cart Road. The automobile equivalent is the Trans-Siberian Highway.

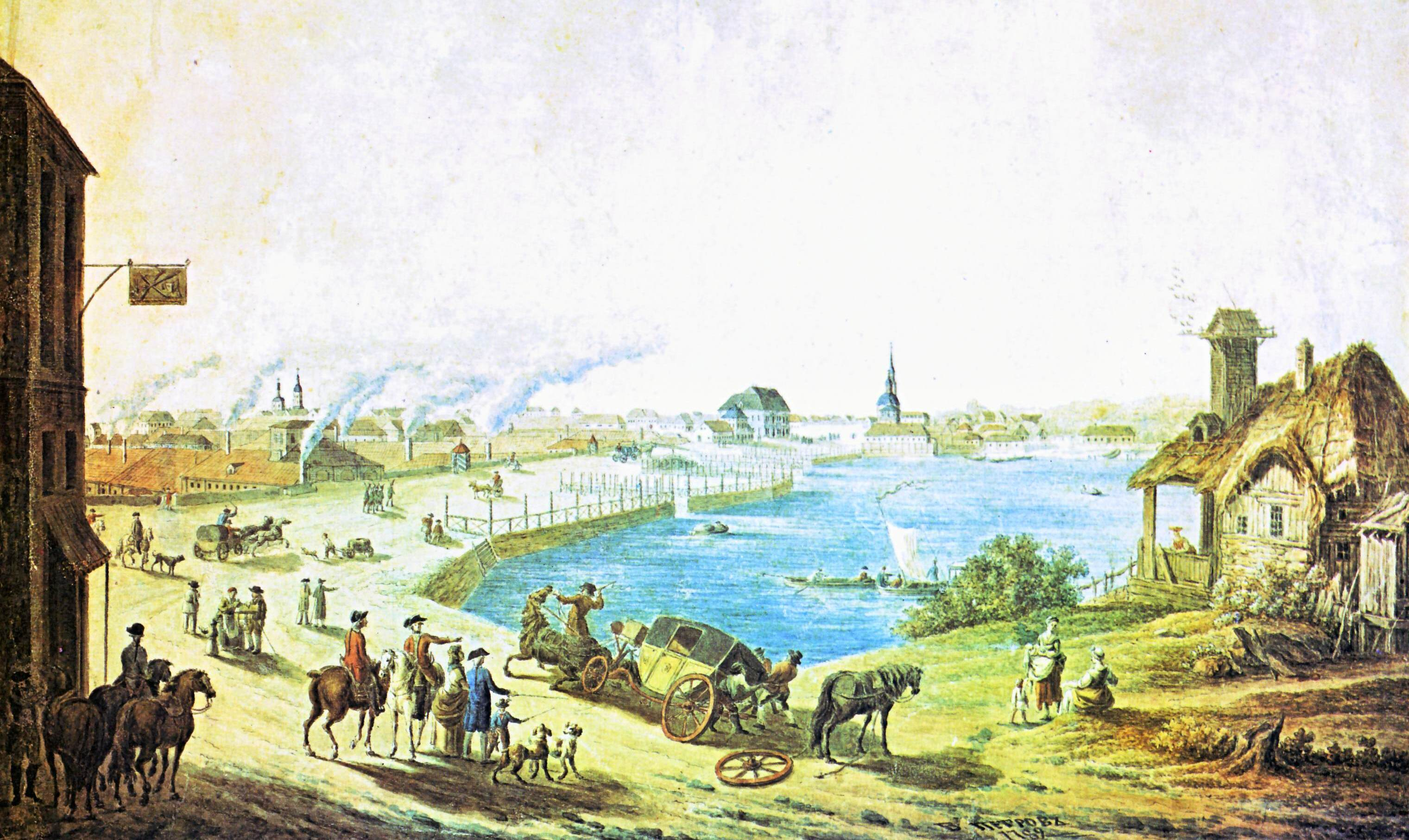
Travellers in Yekaterinburg, 1789

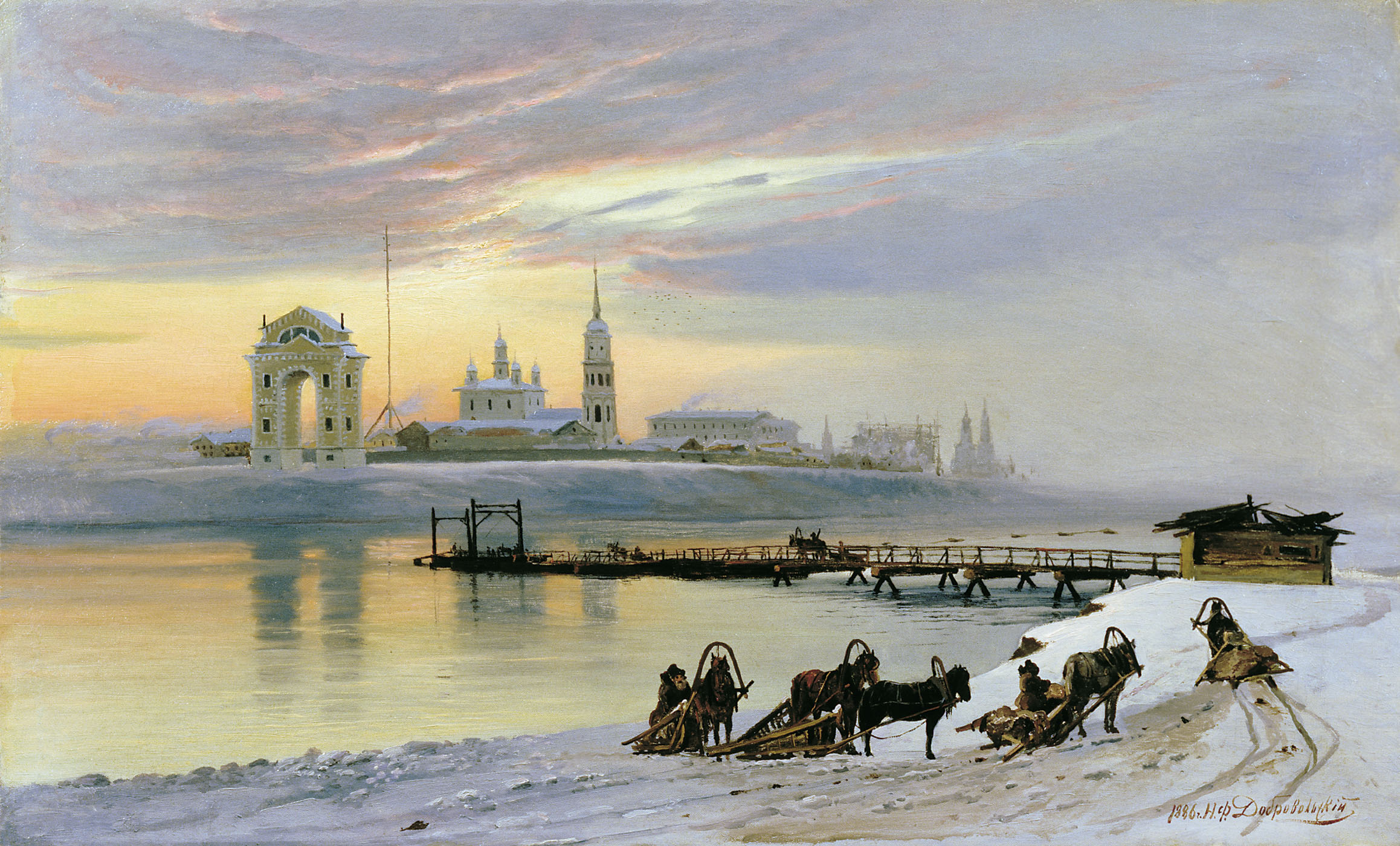
Crossing the Angara at Irkutsk, 1886.

== Etymology and legacy of name ==
The Siberian Route was also known as the Tea Road, owing to the great quantities of tea that were transported from China to Europe through Siberia. Charles Wenyon, who passed by the "Great Post Road" in 1893, subscribed to the popular belief that "the best tea produced in China for the exportation goes to Russia".

In 1915, China exported to Siberia 70,297 tons of tea, which accounted for 65% of the country's overall tea exports. The route is the namesake of the Russian Caravan blend of tea.

It was imported primarily in the form of hefty hard-packed tea bricks which allowed each camel to carry large quantities in a more compact manner and could also pass for units of currency. From Kyakhta, tea was transported to the Irbit fair for further commercial transactions. Another popular Chinese import item was dried rhubarb root, which was sold west of St. Petersburg "for fifteen times what it cost in Kyakhta".

== See also ==
- Tea in Russia
- Kyakhta Russian-Chinese Pidgin
