= Verkhoturye =

Historical town in Sverdlovsk Oblast, Russia

Verkhoturye Верхоту́рье
- Town
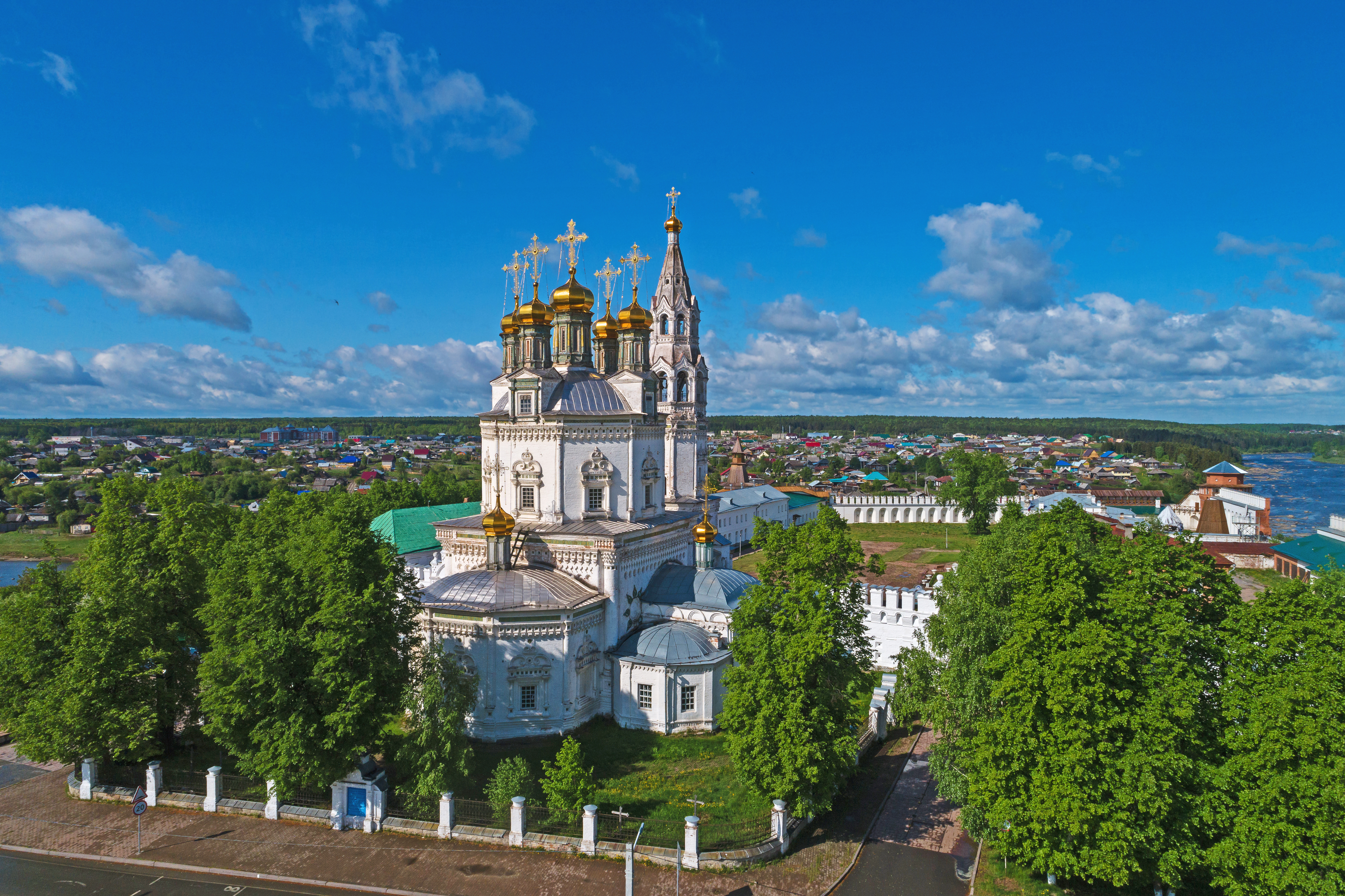
- View of the town

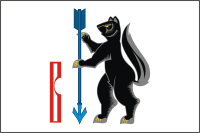
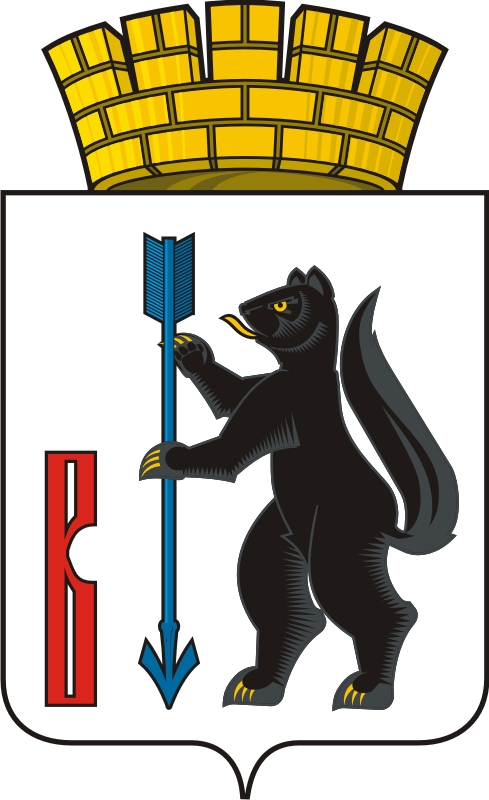
- Flag Coat of arms
- Interactive map of Verkhoturye
- Location of Verkhoturye Verkhoturye (Sverdlovsk Oblast)
- Coordinates: 58°52′00″N 60°48′00″E
- Country: Russia
- Federal subject: Sverdlovsk Oblast
- Founded: 1598
- Town status since: 1598
- Elevation: 115 m (377 ft)

Population
  - Estimate (2019): 8,593 )

Administrative status
  - Capital of: Verkhotursky District
- Time zone: UTC+5 (MSK+2)
- Postal code: 624380–624382
- Dialing code: +7 34389
- OKTMO ID: 65709000001
- Website: adm-verhotury.ru

Verkhoturye (Russian: Верхоту́рье) is a historical town and the administrative center of Verkhotursky District of Sverdlovsk Oblast, Russia, located in the middle Ural Mountains on the left bank of the Tura River 306 kilometers (190 mi) north of Yekaterinburg. Population: 8,820 (2010 census); 7,815 (2002 Census; 8,973 (1989 Soviet census); 10,900 (1967).

== History ==
Verkhoturye was founded in 1598 by Vasily Golovin and Ivan Voyeykov on the site of the Mansi settlement of Neromkar. Western Mansi was recorded to be still spoken in the vicinity of the town around the end of the 18th century. There were major fires in 1674 and 1738. The railroad arrived in 1906. It lost town status in 1926 and regained it in 1947. Two oil pipelines pass through the area and there are plans to build an oil refinery.

In contrast to the surrounding mining towns, Verkhoturye has been relatively untouched by industrialization and much of its historic appearance has been preserved. Being one of the oldest Russian settlements east of the Urals, and with forty churches in the area, Verkhoturye is considered one of the centers of Russian Christianity. Famous churches include the Trinity Church (1703–1712), Nikolay Monastery (established in 1604) with the Cathedral of Exaltation of the Holy Cross (1905–1913), and Transfiguration Church (1821). In addition, the town houses the oldest female monastery beyond Urals (established in 1621).

Some Polish insurgents of the January Uprising were exiled in Verkhoturye in the 1860s.

=== The Gateway to Siberia ===
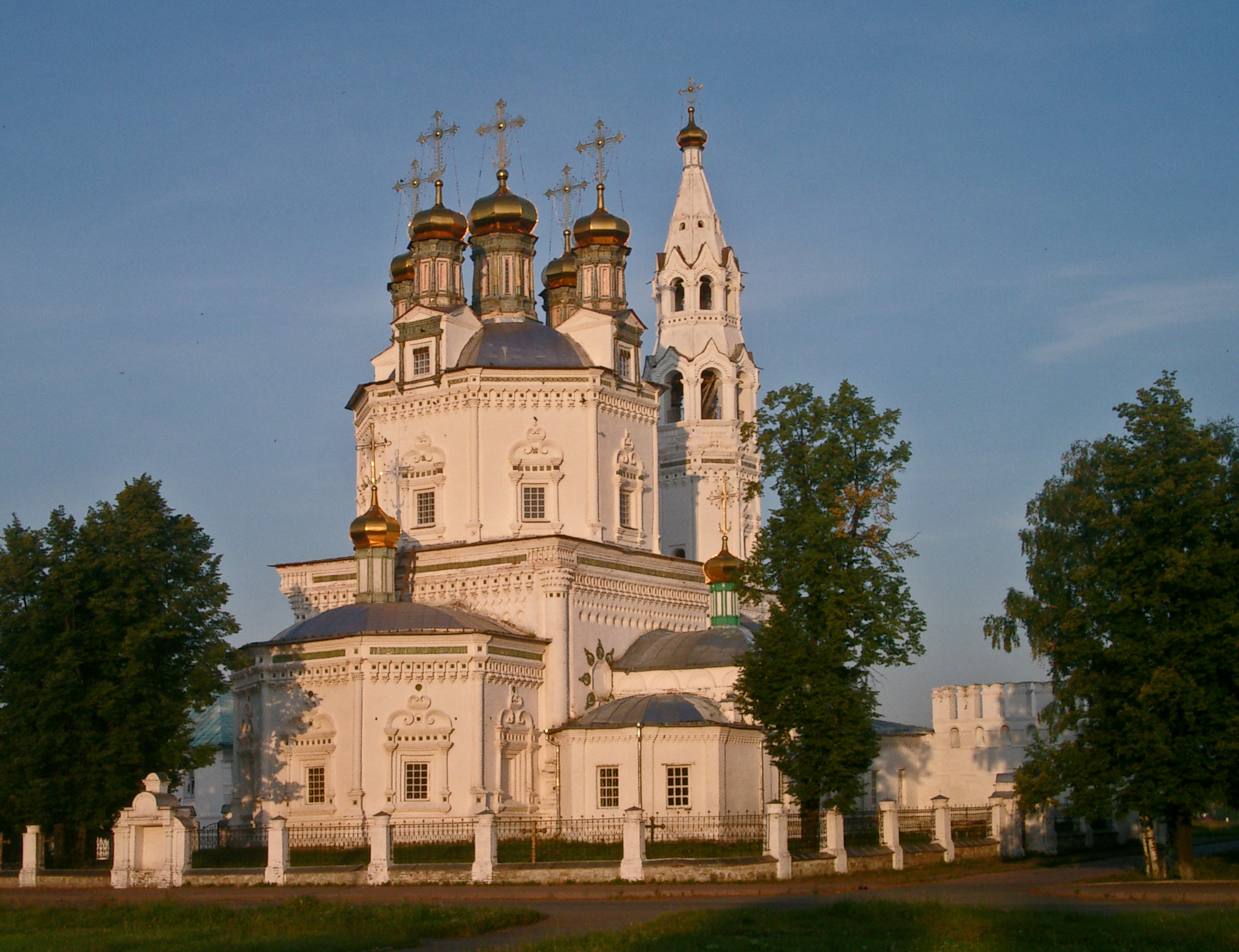
The Trinity Cathedral was built in 1703-12

The relatively low middle Ural Mountains at the latitude of Verkhoturye form a natural gateway into Siberia from the west. With the Russian conquest of Siberia and the foundation of the trans-Ural Russian towns of Tyumen in 1586 and Tobolsk in 1587 the problem arose of finding the best route to them from European Russia. Around 1580, Yermak Timofeyevich had ascended the Chusovaya River south of Verkhoturye and crossed to the Barancha, a tributary of the Tagil River. This route was abandoned because the upper Tagil was too shallow. Around 1590 a more northerly route was opened from Cherdyn north of Solikamsk up to the Vishera River and down the Lozva River. In 1597 Artemy Babinov pioneered what became the standard route. This Babinsky Road ran overland from Solikamsk on the western slope of the Urals to Verkhoturye. An ostrog (fort) was built at Verkhoturye in 1598 and a customs house in 1600 or 1601. Until about 1763, Babinov's route was the main road into Siberia. All winter sledges would haul goods from Solikamsk to Verkhoturye where they were stockpiled until the spring thaw. Siberian furs collected as yasak (tribute) passed through Verkhoturye en route to the Sable Treasury in Moscow. Privately owned furs leaving Siberia paid a 10% tax unless the merchant could prove that the tax had been paid in Siberia. Goods entering Siberia paid a 4% tax (in addition to the 10% paid when the goods were sold). Goods coming and going were inspected and inventoried to prevent contraband. Guard posts were set up in the region to prevent people from slipping around the custom house.

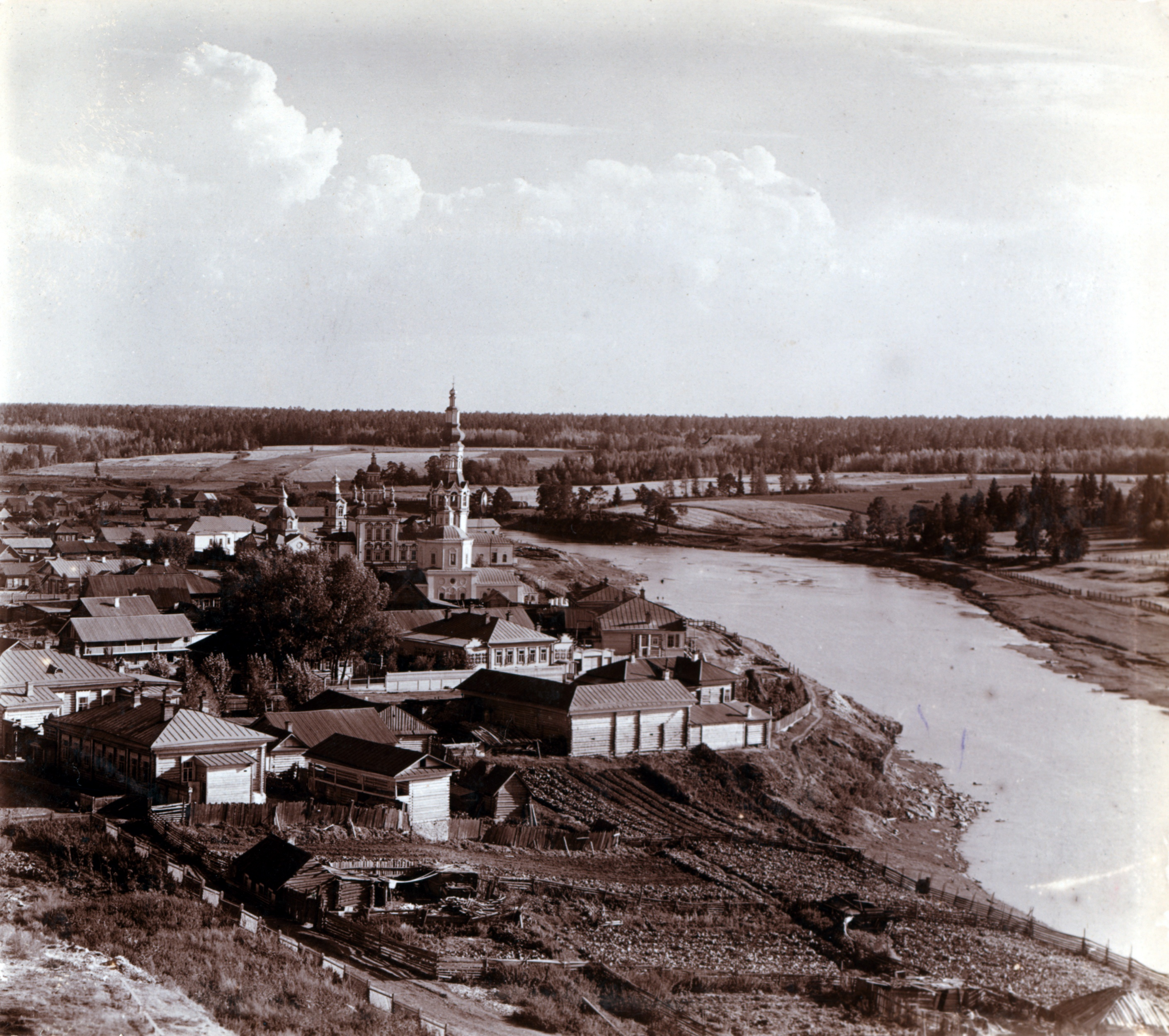
Verkhoturye in 1910

Around 1600, Turinsk was built downriver and a winter ice-road was built to connect the two settlements. At some point the Irbit Fair downriver became a major trading place. In 1695, all routes from the Kama basin except Verkhoturye were legally closed. Verkhoturye declined from about 1763 when the Siberian Route was built through Yekaterinburg to the south. In the 1770s, the toll for crossing into Siberia was abolished or reduced.

=== Other Ural crossings ===
To the north the three crossing points were the Arctic Ocean, the Usa River, and the Northern Sosva River. These all connected the lower Ob River to the Pechora River and the export port of Arkhangelsk. The routes around Verkhoturye connected Tobolsk to the Kama River tributary of the Volga and on to the Sable Treasury at Moscow. Below Verkhoturye there was an old caravan route which led to the Ufa steppe and the Volga River. This became more important as the Volga population increased, but remained minor because it did not lead to either Moscow or Arkhangelsk.
