= Turukhan =

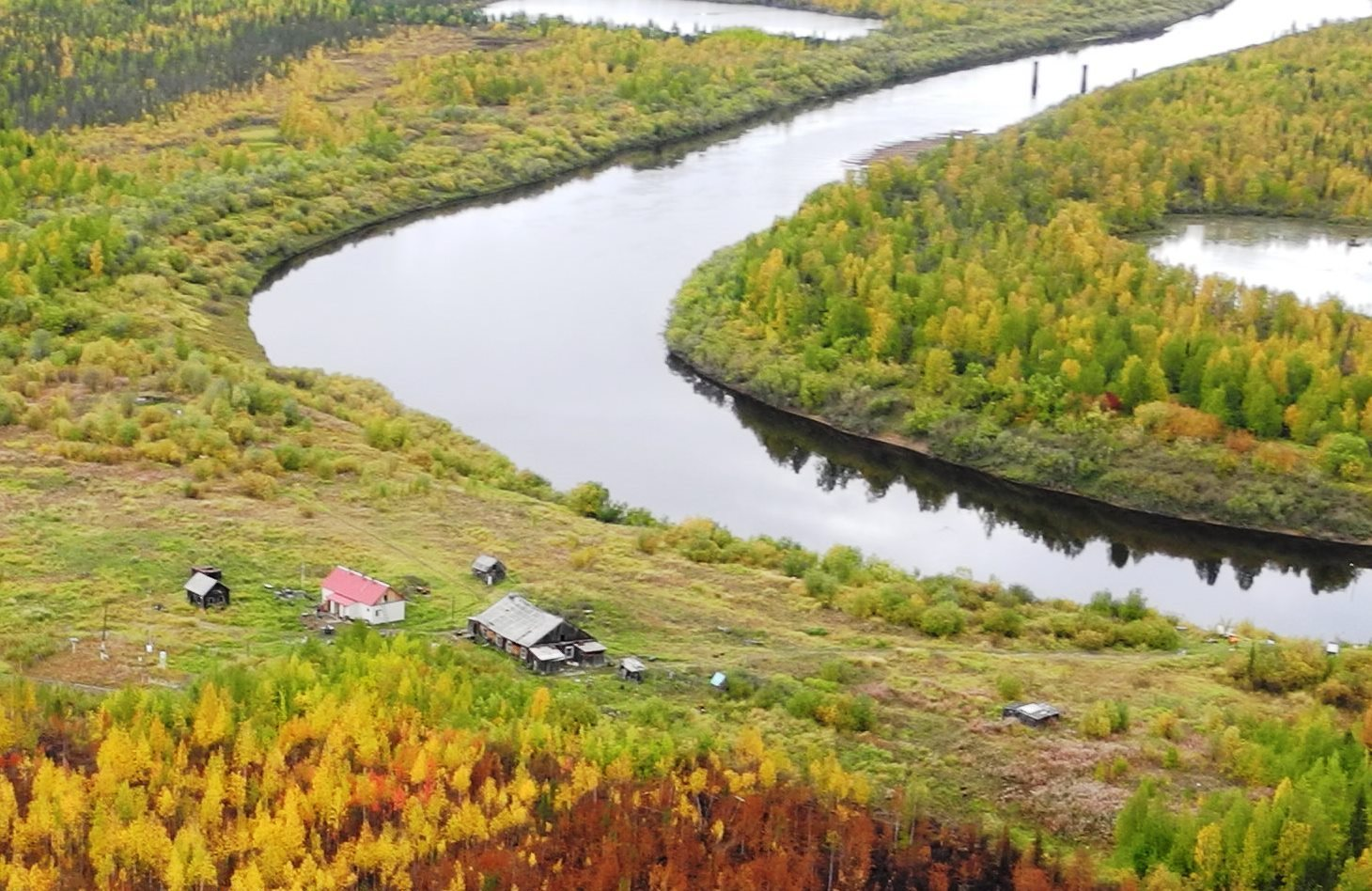

Location
- Country: Russia

Physical characteristics
- Mouth: Yenisey
  - coordinates: 65.9356°N 87.5638°E
- Length: 639 km (397 mi)
- Basin size: 35,800 km^{2} (13,800 sq mi)

Basin features
- Progression: Yenisey→ Kara Sea

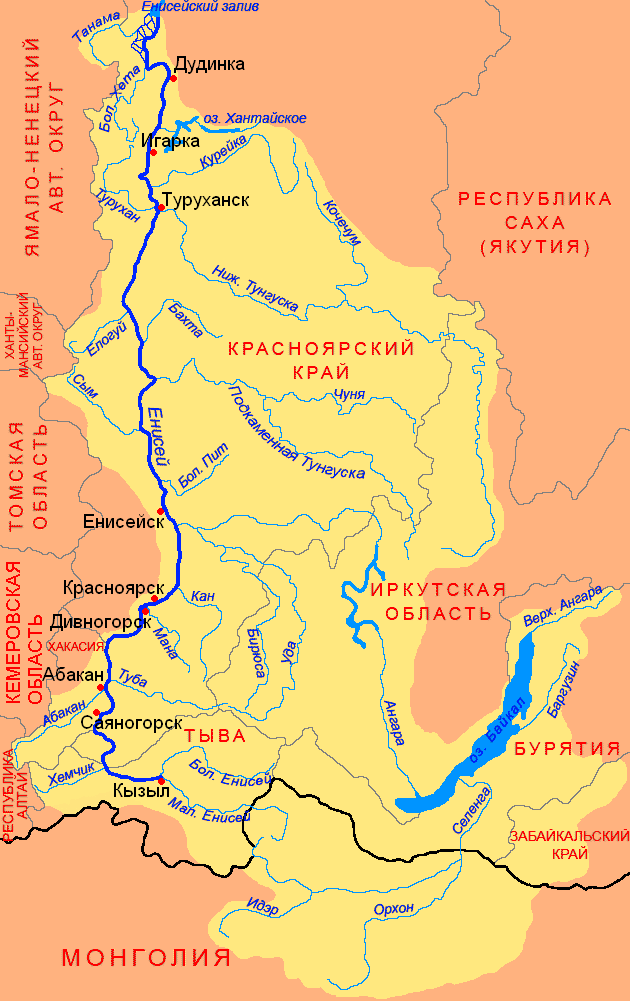
The river enters the Yenisey near Туруханск near the top of the map

The Turukhan (Russian: Турухан) is a river in northern Krasnoyarsk Krai in Russia. It is a southeast-flowing left tributary of the Yenisey. The river is 639 kilometres (397 mi) long. The area of its basin is 35,800 square kilometres (13,800 mi^{2}). The Turukhan freezes up in October and stays under the ice until late May or the first half of June. Its main tributaries are the Usomchik, Bolshaya Bludnaya, Verkhnyaya Baikha and Nizhnyaya Baikha from the right and Makovskaya from the left. Its mouth is 20 kilometres (12 mi) downstream from Turukhansk, where the Lower Tunguska joins the Yenisei. The river is navigable for about 288 kilometres (179 mi) from its mouth to the settlement of Yanov Stan. It was part of the canoe route from the Gulf of Ob – Taz – Turukhan – Yenisey – Nizhnyaya Tunguska – Yakutsk (see Siberian River Routes). The uncompleted Salekhard–Igarka Railway from the Ob to the Yenisey was planned to cross the Turukhan at Yanov Stan.

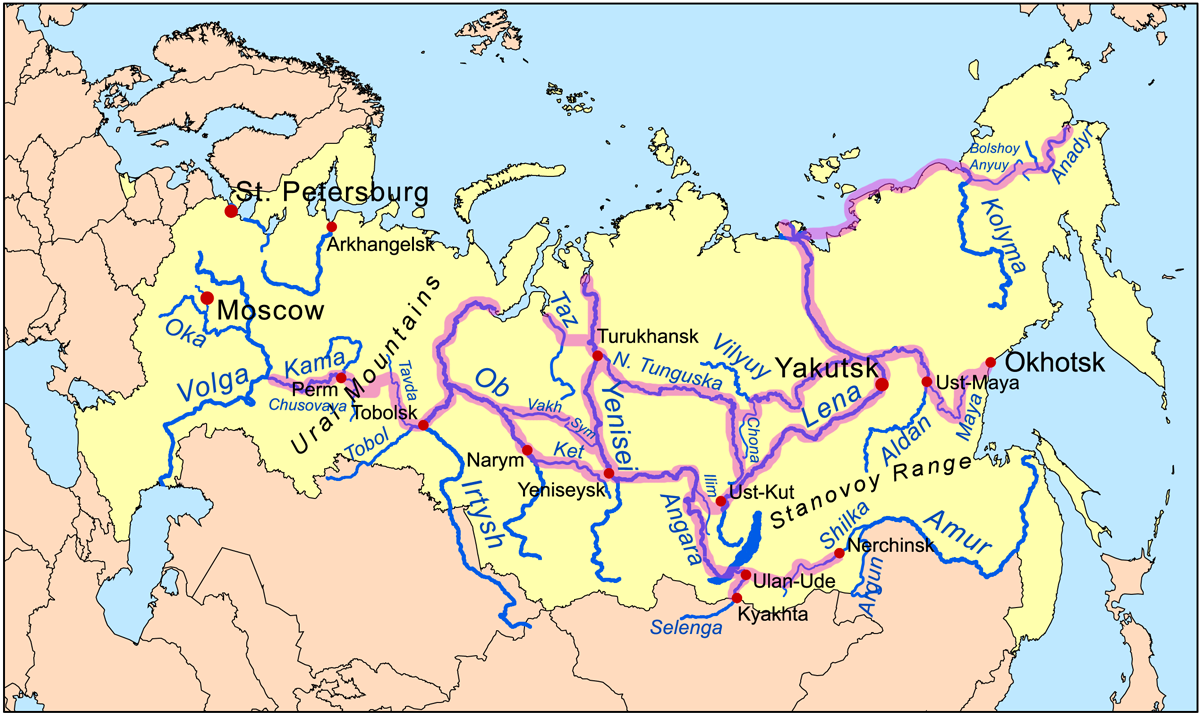
Turukhansk at the center of this map of Siberian River Routes.

== See also ==
- List of rivers of Russia
