= Artemy Babinov =

Russian explorer

Artemy Safronovich Babinov (Russian: Артемий Сафронович Бабинов; died after 1619) was a Russian explorer from the village of Verkh-Usolka. He discovered the shortest path across the Urals from Solikamsk in the Perm region to Verkhoturye in the east in 1597. Babinov's Road was eight times shorter than the Cherdyn Route previously used. His story remains popular in the Urals. It is claimed that Babinov secretly followed the Vogul hunters through the woods, marking the road with broken branches. As a reward for his discovery, Tsar Feodor I of Russia gave him a sizable tract of land and exempted him from payment of taxes.
