= Cherdyn Route =

Standard route used by the Russians to travel to Siberia in the late 16th century

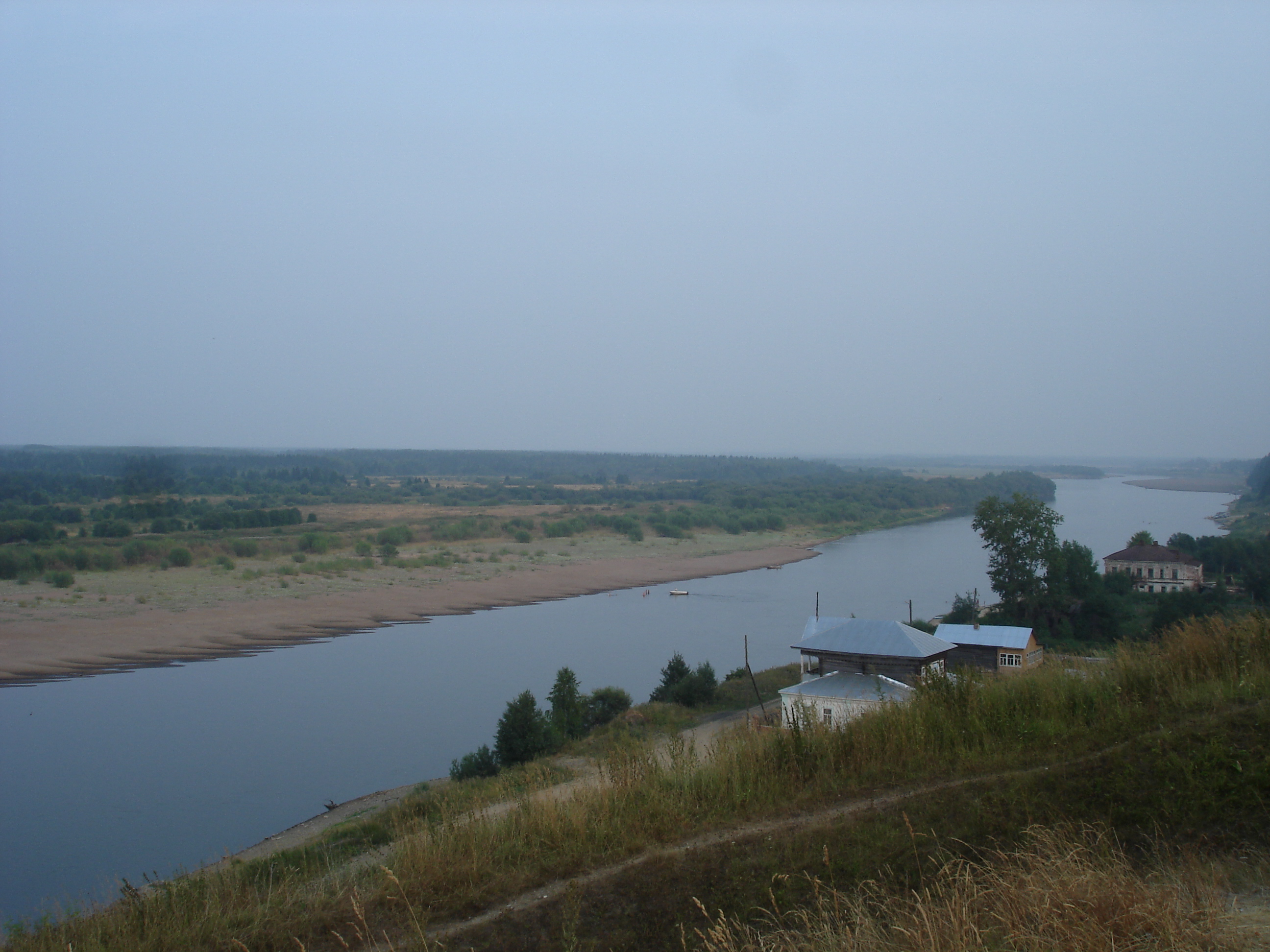
The starting point of the route

The Cherdyn Road (Чердынская дорога) or Vishera Road (Вишерская дорога) was the standard route used by the Russians to travel to Siberia in the late 16th century. It started in Cherdyn west of the Urals and followed a number of rivers and portages, from the Vishera through the Lozva and the Tavda to the Tobol River.

Around 1580, Yermak and his Cossacks ascended the Chusovaya River and crossed to the Barancha, a tributary of the Tagil River. They succeeded in penetrating the Khanate of Siberia and conquering the area. This route was abandoned because the upper Tagil was too shallow.

In 1592, the Russian fort of Pelym was built to guard the eastern terminus of the Cherdyn Road. It was not until 1597 that a much shorter overland route was discovered by Artemy Babinov. As a result, the Cherdyn Route fell into disuse.

== See also ==
- Siberian river routes
