= Pelym (river) =

- Tobol river basin

Location
- Country: Russia
- Federal subject: Sverdlovsk Oblast

Physical characteristics
- Mouth: Tavda
  - coordinates: 59.6256°N 63.0758°E
- Length: 707 km (439 mi)
- Basin size: 15,200 km^{2} (5,900 sq mi)

Basin features
- Progression: Tavda→ Tobol→ Irtysh→ Ob→ Kara Sea

The Pelym (Russian: Пелым) or Bolshoy Pelym (Russian: Большой Пелым) is a river in the far north of Sverdlovsk Oblast, Russia. It is a left tributary of the Tavda, and is 707 kilometres (439 mi) long, with a drainage basin of 15,200 square kilometres (5,900 mi^{2}).

The Pelym has its sources on the eastern slopes of the northern Ural Mountains and flows from there over wooded areas of the West Siberian Plain. The river is frozen over from October to April.

It is navigable on the lower 245 kilometres (152 mi).
