= Yasak =

Fur tribute from indigenous peoples of Siberia to Russian state

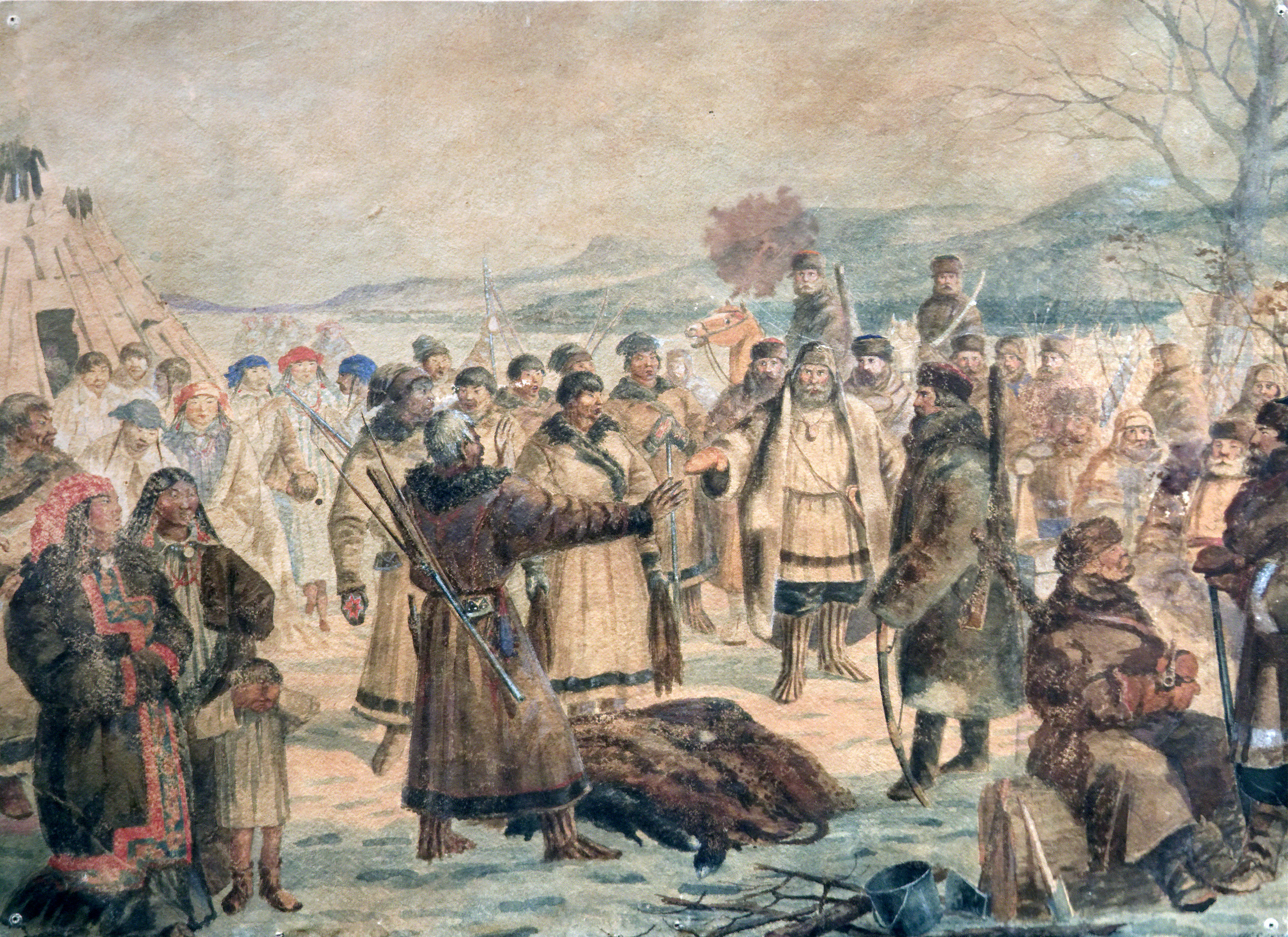
The cossacks of the Yeniseysk Governorate collecting yasak

Yasak or yasaq, sometimes iasak, (Russian: ясак; akin to Yassa) is a Turkic word for "tribute" that was used in Imperial Russia to designate fur tribute extracted from the indigenous peoples of Siberia.

== Origin ==
The origins of yasak can be traced to a tax collected from native, primarily non-Turkic populations in the Golden Horde. The word yasaq is a Russian variation of the Qazaq/Turk word 'Zhasaq'.

The exact time when the concept of yasak was introduced in Muscovy is uncertain. It appears likely, however, that the tax was inherited by Muscovy from the Volga khanates of Kazan and Astrakhan - two fragments of the Golden Horde that were subjugated by Ivan IV in the 1550s. These territories were settled by a range of non-Christian peoples who were expected to pay yasak either in kind or cash. The late French scholar of Eurasian history, Renee Grousset, traces "yasaq" (Regulations) back still further in his classic work, The Empire of the Steppes, to the moral code imposed by Genghis Khan on his original horde. The Yasaq continued to be practiced by Mongol hordes until they came under Vajrayana Buddhist influences (in Mongolia and China) and Islamic influences (among the Golden Horde, in Persia, and in Central Asia) during successive centuries.

The earliest mention of the tax is found in a letter sent by Ismail (a ruler of the Nogai Horde and ancestor of the Yusupov family) to Tsar Ivan IV in 1559, three years after Ivan's conquest of the Volga Delta and Astrakhan. The border between the two polities was not yet established, and Ismail complained that Ivan's governor of Astrakhan demanded yasak from those inhabitants of the delta that Ismail considered his subjects: "in grain from those who farm and in fish from those who fish"

== Nature ==
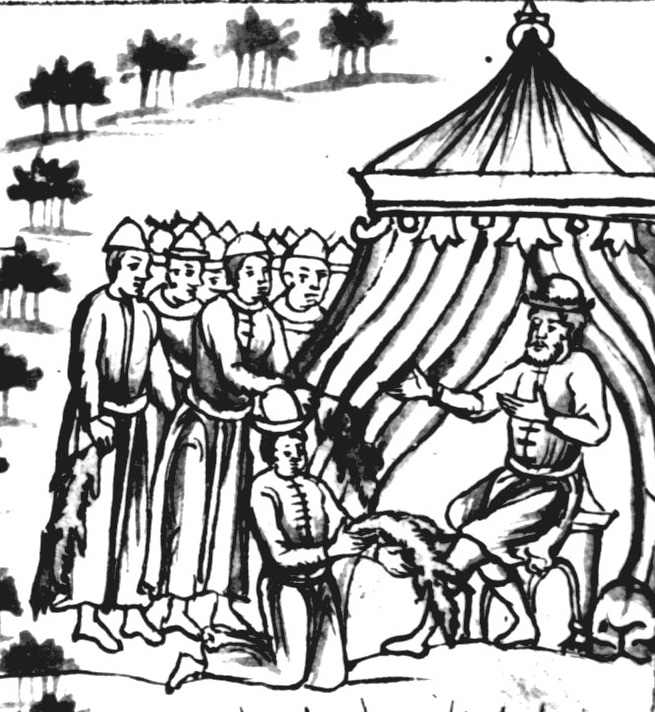
Voguls delivering a tribute of fur to Yermak Timofeyevich.

Yasak was gradually introduced in North Asia in the 17th century as a consequence of Russia's conquest of Siberia. The Tsar's relationship with natives was based on a quid pro quo principle. The annual delivery of yasak by the native representatives was normally accompanied by a state-sponsored feast and distribution of royal gifts to the natives. This compensation included tobacco, flints, knives, axes, and other useful tools. Some native populations, especially in the Far East, favored multi-colored crystal beads. The local voyevoda could also provide the yasak-payers ("ясачные люди") with supplies of provisions such as fish oil.

When the Tsar failed to deliver due compensation or his presents were deemed insufficient or too cheap, the yasak-payers would voice their discontent. According to one 17th-century report, not only the yasak-gatherers were beaten, but the natives proceeded to:

"...throw the sovereign's presents, and tie them onto dog's necks, and throw them into the fire, and they pay yasak with no courtesy, they kick it with their feet and throw it to the ground and they call us, your servants, bad people."

On several occasions, such conflicts prompted the natives to rise in rebellion against the Muscovite government. Against this volatile background, the Tsar's officials worked to transform yasak from an exchange of items (the centuries-old concept inherited from the Khanate of Siberia and Golden Horde) into a fixed and regular levy, but this process took centuries to complete. In many frontier areas:

"...the regular supply of... presents to the local ruler and his nobles was, in fact, the only way to secure the natives' cooperation."

In the basin of the Volga, yasak was replaced by a regular tax in the 1720s, and most of Siberia followed suit in 1822. A largely symbolic form of yasak continued to be levied from the nomadic peoples of Eastern Siberia (Yakuts, Evenks, Chukchi) until the Russian Revolution of 1917.

== Collection ==
Yasak collection procedures were not strictly regulated and varied considerably from ulus to ulus. A census was required to determine the numbers of yasak-payers, with results recorded in a list of yasak-payers, or "yasak-book", of which more than 1,700 survive from the 17th century alone. Each male yasak-payer between the ages of 18 and 50 was expected to take a shert, or an oath of allegiance to the Tsar.

Most peoples of Siberia paid tribute on a house-to-house basis, but the Yakut people delivered it based on the number of cattle in each household, while the Bashkir people paid yasak on the basis of a land census. Yasak was payable in sables, red foxes, beavers, martens; cattle was also allowed as payment in some circumstances. Yasak payments formed the basis for Russia's fur trade with Western Europe.

The Siberian Prikaz was responsible for yasak collection in Muscovite Russia. In 1727, an ukase decreed that yasak could be paid in cash, but this measure was found to be less than profitable for the imperial treasury and, twelve years later, it was revoked. The Cabinet of Ministers then decreed that yasak be paid in sables, or, in the absence thereof, in other furs.

Catherine the Great undertook a reform of yasak collection by instituting a number of "yasak commissions", with the head office located in Tobolsk. In 1827 the task of yasak collection was entrusted to two principal yasak commissions, one for Eastern Siberia and another for Western Siberia, whose activities were regulated by a special statute.

== Bibliography ==
- Forsyth, James (1992). A History of the Peoples of Siberia: Russia's North Asian Colony, 1581-1990. Cambridge University Press, 1992.
