= Irbit Fair =

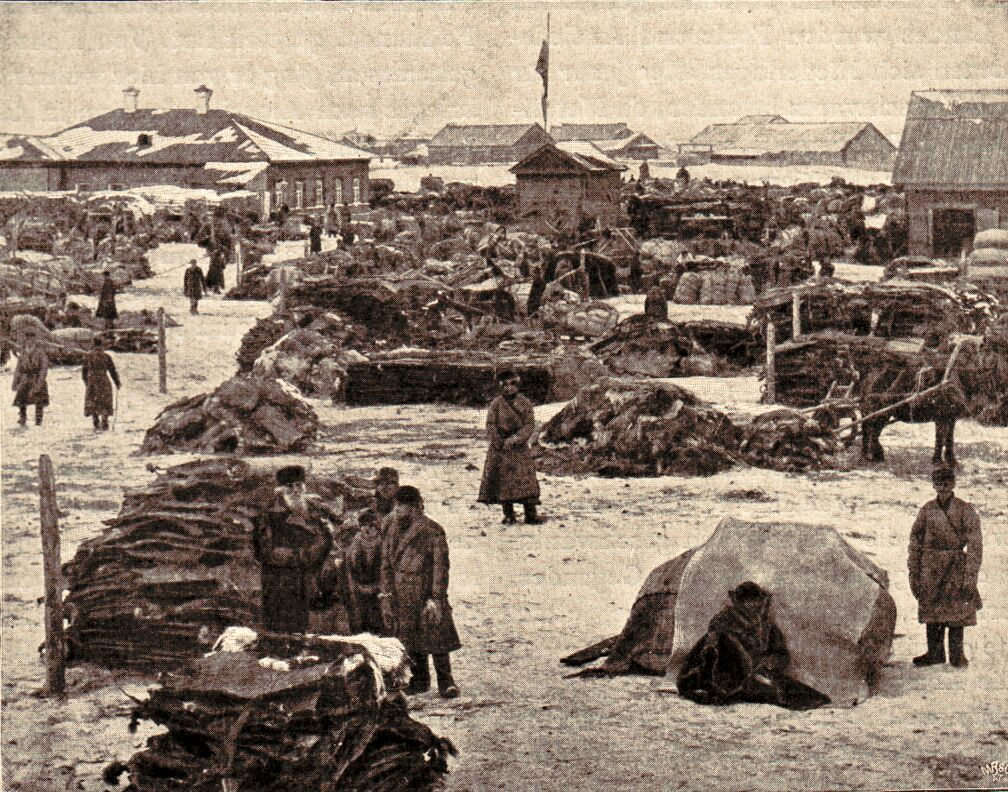
The fur market in Irbit (1900)

The Irbit fair (Russian: Ирби́тская я́рмарка, Irbitskaya yarmarka) was the second largest fair in Imperial Russia after the Makariev Fair. It was held annually in winter in the town of Irbit, trading with tea and fur brought along the Siberian trakt from Asia.

As Thomas Wallace Knox (1835–96) writes in his book Overland through Asia; Pictures of Siberian, Chinese, and Tatar Life (1870):

We met many sledges laden with goods en route to the fair which takes place every February at Irbit. This fair is of great importance to Siberia, and attracts merchants from all the region west of Tomsk. From forty to fifty million rubles worth of goods are exchanged there during the four weeks devoted to traffic. The commodities from Siberia are chiefly furs and tea, those from Europe comprise a great many articles. Irbit is on the Asiatic side of the Ural mountains, about two hundred versts northeast of Ekaterineburg. It is a place of little consequence except during the time of the fair.

The fair dominated the town and shaped its architecture and layout. Long, narrow dormitories are a feature of the old town with enormous wharf areas being found at the juncture of the Nitsa and Irbit rivers.

The fair was originally founded in 1643. With the interruptions to the fair following the October Revolution and Russian Civil War and the effects of the Trans-Siberian Railway on trade, the fair ceased in 1929 and the town lost its importance as an agricultural and trade center.

== Cultural references ==
- The Irbit fair is mentioned in the novel Doctor Zhivago by Boris Pasternak as a place visited by Yuri Zhivago's father.
