= Tavda (river) =

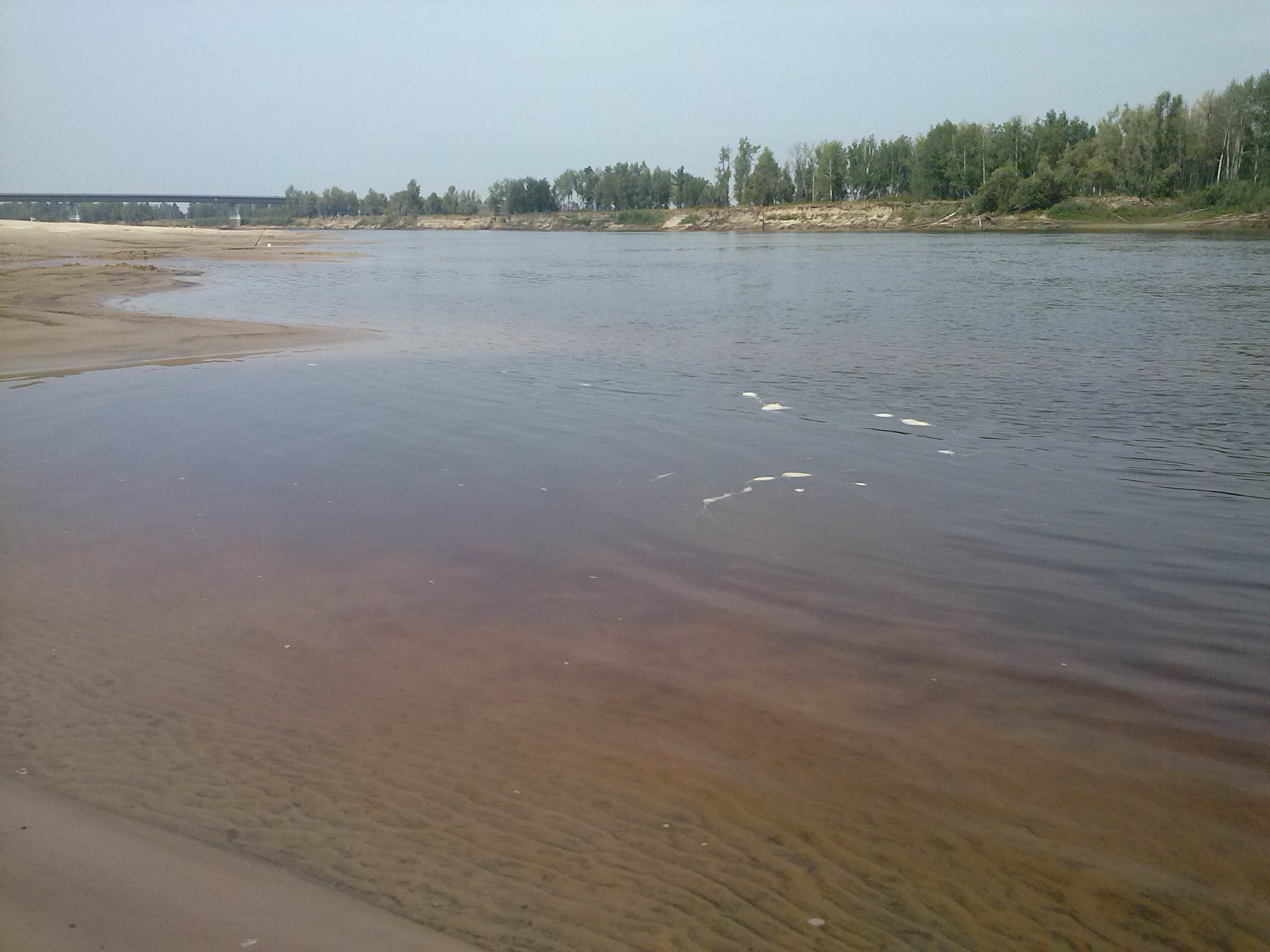

- The Tavda in the Tobol basin

Location
- Country: Russia

Physical characteristics
- Mouth: Tobol
  - coordinates: 57°47′51″N 67°15′23″E
- Length: 719 km (447 mi)
- Basin size: 88,100 km^{2} (34,000 sq mi)

Basin features
- Progression: Tobol→ Irtysh→ Ob→ Kara Sea
- Tributaries
  - left: Lozva, Pelym
  - right: Sosva

The Tavda (Russian: Тавда Mansi: Тагт, Tagt) is a Siberian river that drains part of the central Ural mountains into the Tobol. It is north of the Tura and south of the Konda. It is located in Sverdlovsk Oblast and Tyumen Oblast.

It is formed by the confluence of the rivers Lozva and Sosva. The Tavda is 719 kilometres (447 mi) long, and its drainage basin covers 88,100 square kilometres (34,000 mi^{2}). The river freezes up in early November and stays icebound until late April. Its main tributary is the Pelym. The Tavda is navigable and is used for timber rafting. The town of Tavda is located on the shores of the Tavda, as is Pelym, the earliest Russian settlement east of the Urals.

The Tavda and its main tributaries, the Sosva, Lozva and Pelym all flow southeast and drain the central Urals. They are shaped like the letter 'Щ', but with a longer tail. The Sosva (the westernmost one) flows southeast, turns somewhat northeast near the town of Sosva, picks up to Lozva and gains the name of Tavda. This continues east, picks up the Pelym and flows southeast into the Tobol between Tyumen and Tobolsk.
