= Babinov Road =

Road in Russia

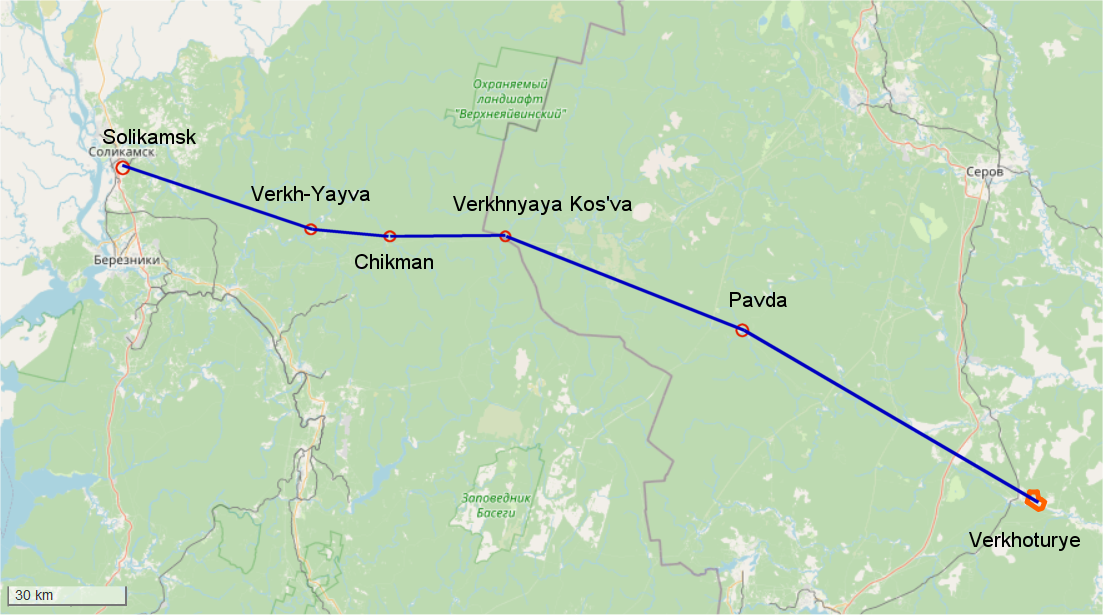

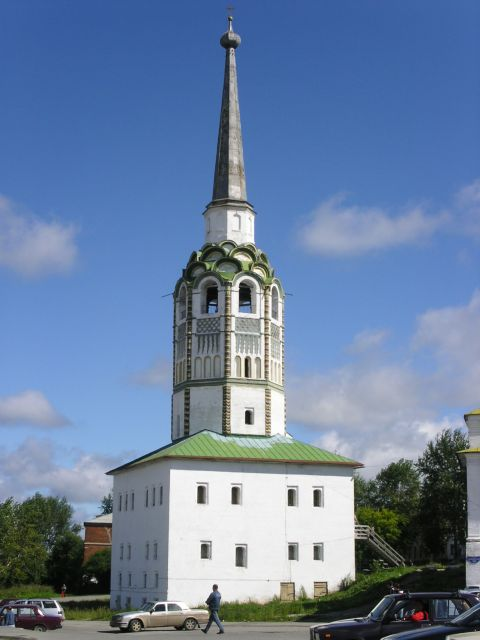
The Solikamsk Belltower was the starting point of the Babinov Road

The Babinov Road (Бабиновская дорога) was for a long time the shortest path across the Urals. It led from Solikamsk to Verkhoturye and thence to Tobolsk in Siberia. It was discovered by Artemy Babinov in 1597 and hacked out of the forests several years later, replacing a complicated river route that had been used in the 16th century.

The construction of the Babinov Road made possible the Russian colonization of Siberia and the enormous territorial growth of the Tsardom of Russia in the 17th century. The route was apparently based on an existing trail used by Khanty and Mansi hunters.

In the 17th century, Russian travellers to Siberia passed through a chain of small forts protecting the road from raids by native tribes. Verkhoturye, the first of these forts, was built at its eastern end in 1598.

Babinov's Road remained the only practicable route from European Russia to Siberia until the construction of the Great Siberian Road in 1735.
