= History of Siberia =

Aspect of Russian history

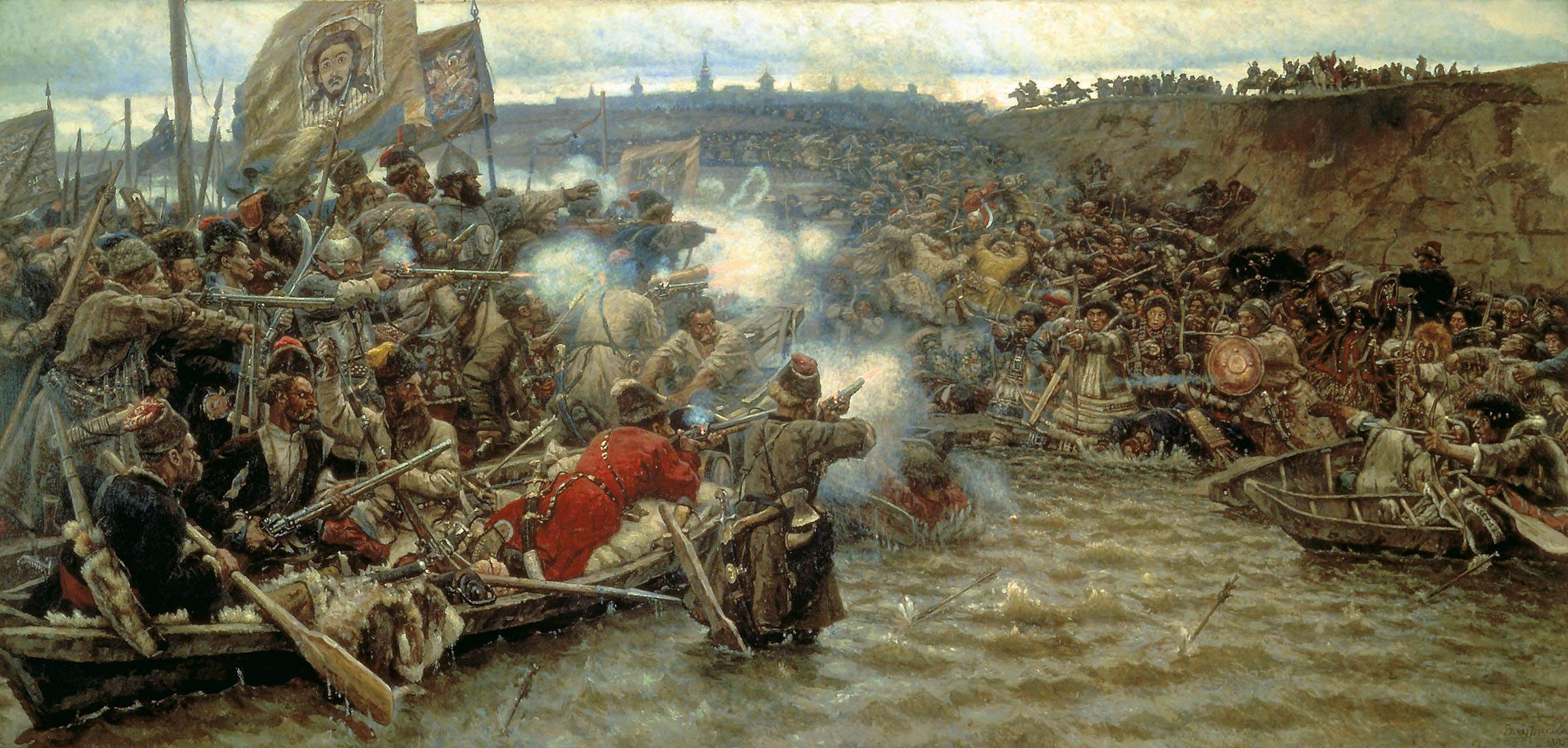
Yermak's Conquest of Siberia, a painting by Vasily Surikov

The early history of Siberia was greatly influenced by the sophisticated nomadic civilizations of the Scythians (Pazyryk) on the west of the Ural Mountains and Xiongnu (Noin-Ula) on the east of the Urals, both flourishing before the common era. The steppes of Siberia were occupied by a succession of nomadic peoples, including the Khitan people, various Turkic peoples, and the Mongol Empire. In the Late Middle Ages, Tibetan Buddhism spread into the areas south of Lake Baikal.

During the Russian Empire, Siberia was chiefly developed as an agricultural province. The government also used it as a place of exile, sending Avvakum, Dostoevsky, and the Decemberists, among others, to work camps in the region. During the 19th century, the Trans-Siberian Railway was constructed, supporting industrialization. This was also aided by discovery and exploitation of vast reserves of Siberian mineral resources.

== Prehistory and antiquity ==
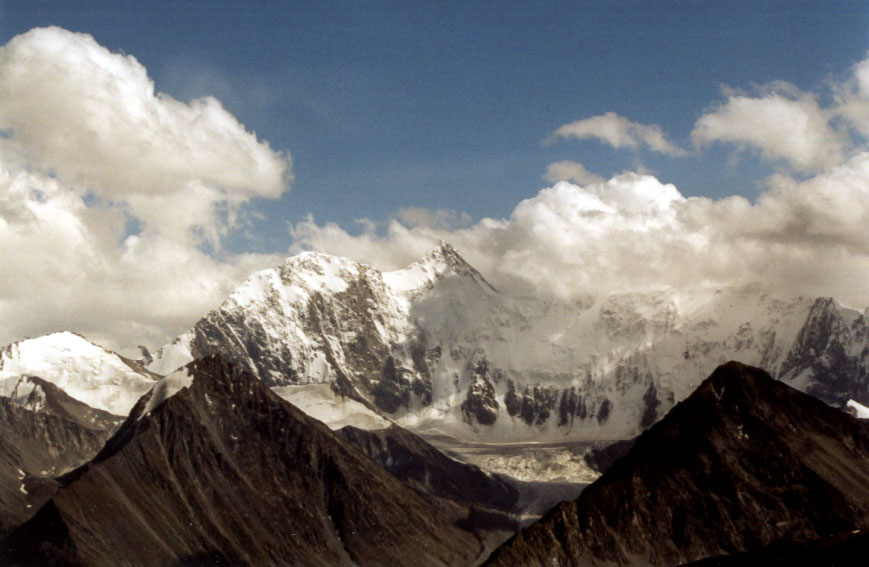
Mount Belukha in the Altai Mountains

According to the field of genetic genealogy, people first resided in Siberia by 45,000 BCE and spread out east and west to populate Europe and the Americas, including the prehistoric Jomon people, who are the ancestors of the modern Japanese and Ainu.

According to Vasily Radlov, among the Paleo-Siberian inhabitants of Central Siberia were the Yeniseians, who spoke a language different from the later Uralic and Turkic people. The Kets are considered the last remainder of this early migration. Migrants are estimated to have crossed the Bering Land Bridge into North America more than 20,000 years ago.

The shores of all Siberian lakes, which filled the depressions during the lacustrine period, abound in remains dating from the Neolithic age. Countless kurgans (tumuli), furnaces, and other archaeological artifacts bear witness to a dense population. Some of the earliest artifacts found in Central Asia derive from Siberia.

The Yeniseians were followed by the Uralic Samoyeds, who came from the northern Ural region. Some descendant cultures, such as the Selkup, remain in the Sayan region. Iron was unknown to them, but they excelled in bronze, silver, and gold work. Their bronze ornaments and implements, often polished, evince considerable artistic taste. They developed and managed irrigation to support their agriculture in wide areas of the fertile tracts.

Indo-Iranian influences in southwestern Siberia can be dated to the 2300–1000 BCE Andronovo culture. Between the 7th and 3rd centuries BCE, the Indo-Iranian Scythians flourished in the Altai region (Pazyryk culture). They were a major influence on all later steppe empires.

As early as the first millennium BCE, trade was underway over the Silk Road. Silk goods were imported and traded in Siberia.

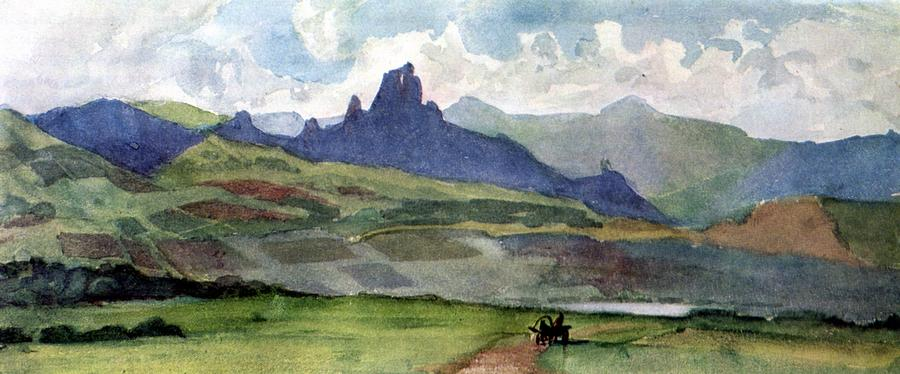
"Minusinsk Steppe", Vasily Surikov's painting

The establishment of the Xiongnu empire in the 3rd century BCE started a series of population movements. Many people were probably driven to the northern borders of the great Central Siberian Plateau. Turkic people such as the Yenisei Kyrgyz had already been present in the Sayan region. Various Turkic tribes such as the Khakas and Uyghurs migrated northwestwards from their former seats and subdued the Ugric people.

These new invaders likewise left numerous traces of their stay, and two different periods may be easily distinguished from their remains. They were acquainted with iron, and learned from their subjects the art of bronze casting, which they used for decorative purposes only. They refined the artistry of this work. Their pottery is more artistic and of a higher quality than that of the Bronze Age. Their ornaments are included among the collections at the Hermitage Museum in Saint Petersburg.

== Middle Ages ==
=== Mongol conquest of Southern and Western Siberia ===
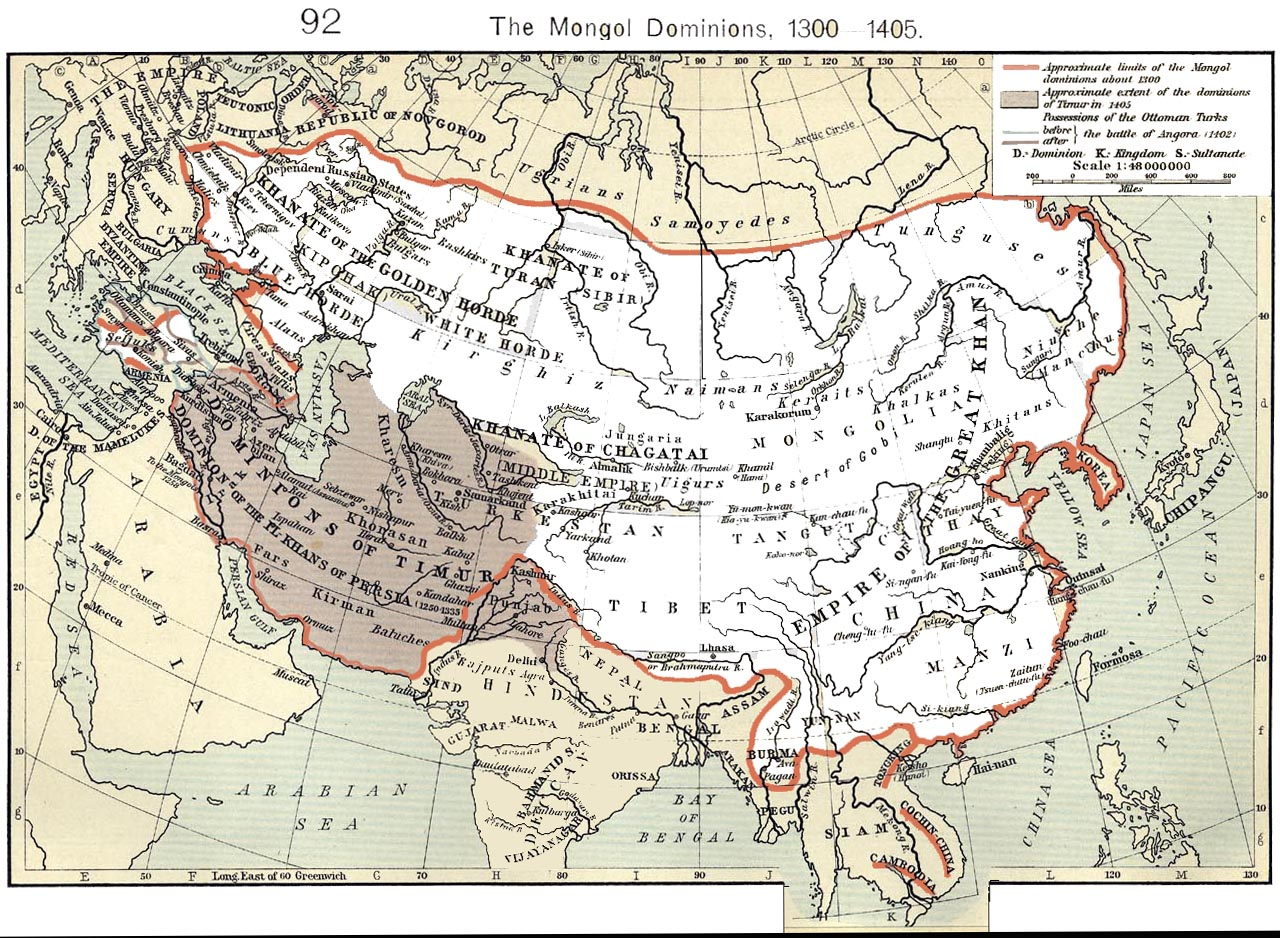
The Mongol Empire, ca. 1300 (the gray area is the later Timurid Empire)

The Mongols had long maintained relations with the people of the Siberian forest (taiga). They called them oin irged ("people of the forest"). Many of them, such as the Barga and Uriankhai, were little different from the Mongols. While the tribes around Lake Baikal were Mongol-speaking, those to the west spoke Turkic, Samoyedic, or Yeniseian languages.

By 1206, Genghis Khan had united all Mongol and Turkic tribes on the Mongolian Plateau and southern Siberia. In 1207, he sent his eldest son Jochi to conquer the Siberian "Forest People", namely the Uriankhai, the Oirats, the Barga, the Khakas, the Buryats, the Tuvans, the Khori-Tumed, Ursut, Qabqanas, Tubas, Kem-Kemjuit, the Yenisei Kyrgyz Khaganate, and others. He then organized the Siberians into three tumens. Genghis Khan gave the Telengit and Tolos along the Irtysh River to an old companion, Qorchi. While the Barga, Tumed, Buriats, Khori, Keshmiti, and Bashkirs were organized in separate thousands, the Telengit, Tolos, Oirats, and Yenisei Kirghiz were numbered as tumens. Genghis created a settlement of ethnic Han craftsmen and farmers at Kem-kemchik after the first phase of the Mongol conquest of the Jin dynasty. The Great Khans favored gyrfalcons, furs, women, and Kyrgyz horses for tribute.

Western Siberia came under the Golden Horde. The descendants of Orda Khan, the eldest son of Jochi, directly ruled the area. In the swamps of western Siberia, dog sled Yam stations were set up to facilitate collection of tribute.

In 1270, Kublai Khan sent an ethnic Han official, with a new batch of settlers, to serve as the judge of the Kyrgyz and Tuvan basin areas (益蘭州 and 謙州). Ögedei's grandson Kaidu occupied portions of Central Siberia from 1275 on. The Yuan dynasty army under Kublai's Kipchak general Tutugh reoccupied the Kyrgyz lands in 1293. From then on the Yuan dynasty controlled large portions of Central and Eastern Siberia.

The Yenisei area had a community of weavers of ethnic Han origin. Samarkand and Outer Mongolia both had artisans of Han origin.

=== Novgorod and Muscovy ===
As early as the 11th century, the Novgorodians had occasionally penetrated into Siberia. In the 14th century, the Novgorodians explored the Kara Sea and the West Siberian river Ob (1364). After the fall of the Novgorod Republic its communications between Northern Russia and Siberia were inherited by the Grand Duchy of Moscow. On 9 May 1483, the Moscow troops of Princes Feodor Kurbski-Cherny and Ivan Saltyk-Travin moved to West Siberia. The troops moved on the rivers Tavda, Tura, Irtysh, up to the river Ob. In 1499, Muscovites and Novgorodians skied to West Siberia, up to the river Ob, and conquered some local tribes.

== Khanate of Sibir ==
The Khanate of Sibir in the 15th and 16th centuries

With the breakup of the Golden Horde late in the 15th century, the Khanate of Sibir was founded with its center at Tyumen. The non-Borjigin Taybughid dynasty vied for rule with the descendants of Shiban, a son of Jochi.

In the beginning of the 16th century, Tatar fugitives from Turkestan subdued the loosely associated tribes inhabiting the lowlands to the east of the Ural Mountains. Agriculturists, tanners, merchants, and mullahs (Muslim clerics) were brought from Turkestan, and small principalities sprang up on the Irtysh and the Ob. Conflicts with the Russians, who were then colonizing the Urals, brought him into collision with Muscovy. Khan Yadegar's envoys came to Moscow in 1555 and consented to a yearly tribute of a thousand sables.

=== Yermak and the Cossacks ===
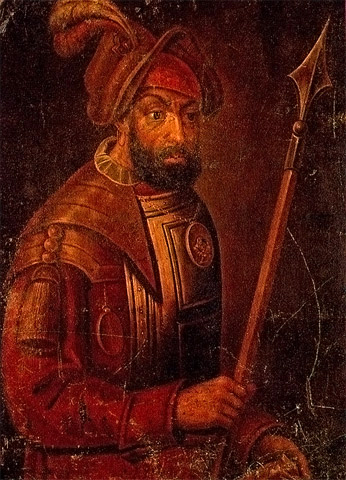
Yermak Timofeyevich

In the mid-16th century, the Tsardom of Russia conquered the Tatar khanates of Kazan and Astrakhan, thus annexing the entire Volga region and making the way to the Ural Mountains open. The colonisation of the new easternmost lands of Russia and further onslaught eastward was led by the rich Stroganov merchant family. Tsar Ivan IV granted large estates near the Urals as well as tax privileges to Anikey Stroganov, who organized large scale migration to these lands. The Stroganovs developed farming, hunting, saltworks, fishing, and ore mining on the Urals and established trade with Siberian tribes.

In the 1570s, the entrepreneur Semyon Stroganov and other sons of Anikey Stroganov enlisted many Cossacks for protection of the Ural settlements against attacks by the Tatars of the Siberian Khanate, led by Khan Kuchum. Stroganov suggested to their chief Yermak, hired in 1577, to conquer the Khanate of Sibir, promising to help him with supplies of food and arms.

In 1581, Yermak began his voyage into the depths of Siberia with a band of 1,636 men, following the Tagil and Tura Rivers. The following year they were on the Tobol, and 500 men successfully laid siege to Qashliq, the residence of Khan Kuchum, near what is now Tobolsk. After a few victories over the khan's army, Yermak's people defeated the main forces of Kuchum on the Irtysh River after the three-day Battle of Chuvash Cape in 1582. The remains of the khan's army retreated to the steppes, abandoning his domains to Yermak, who, according to tradition, by presenting Siberia to Tsar Ivan IV achieved his own restoration to favour.

Kuchum was still strong and suddenly attacked Yermak in 1585 in the dead of night, killing most of his people. Yermak was wounded and tried to swim across the Wagay River (Irtysh's tributary), but drowned under the weight of his own chain mail. Yermak's Cossacks had to withdraw from Siberia completely, but every year new bands of hunters and adventurers, supported by Moscow, poured into the country. Thanks to Yermak's having explored all the main river routes in West Siberia, Russians successfully reclaimed all of Yermak's conquests just several years later.

== Russian exploration and settlement ==
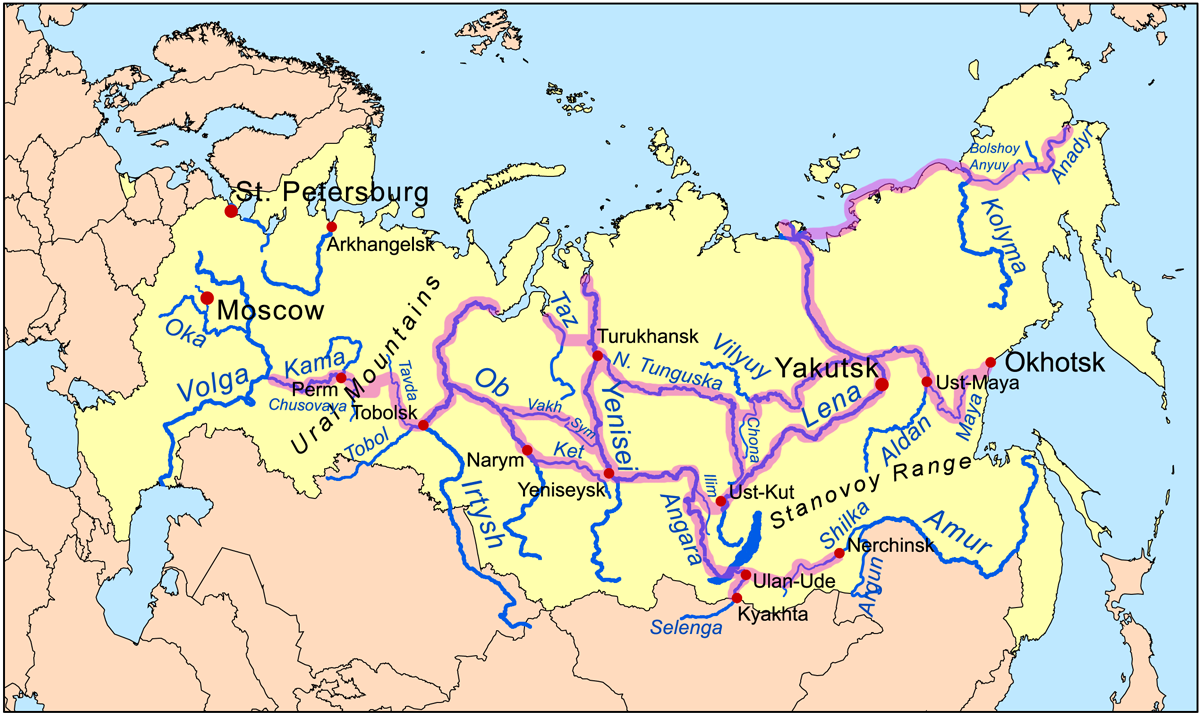
Siberian River Routes were of primary importance in the process of Russian exploration and conquest of Siberia.

In the early 17th century, the eastward movement of Russian people was slowed by the internal problems in the country during the Time of Troubles. However, very soon the exploration and colonization of the huge territories of Siberia was resumed, led mostly by Cossacks hunting for valuable furs and ivory. While Cossacks came from the Southern Urals, another wave of Russian people came by the Arctic Ocean. These were Pomors from the Russian North, who had already been trading fur with Mangazeya in the north of the Western Siberia for quite a long time. In 1607, the settlement of Turukhansk was founded on the northern Yenisey River, near the mouth of the Lower Tunguska. In 1619, Yeniseysky ostrog was founded on the mid-Yenisey at the mouth of the Upper Tunguska. As the Russian state expanded across Siberia, it welcomed Bukharan merchants from Central Asia to settle in Siberia. Bukharans formed diaspora communities that participated in important trade circulation and served the Russian imperial state in commerce-related and diplomatic roles.

In 1620, a group of fur hunters led by the semi-legendary Demid Pyanda started out from Turukhansk on what would become a very protracted journey. According to folk tales related a century after the fact, in the three and a half years from 1620 to 1624, Pyanda allegedly traversed the total of 4,950 miles (7,970 km) of hitherto unknown large Siberian rivers. He explored some 1,430 miles (2,300 km) of the Lower Tunguska (Nizhnyaya Tunguska in Russian) and, having reached the upper part of the Tunguska, he came upon the great Siberian river Lena and explored some 1,500 miles (2,400 km) of its length. By doing this, he may have become the first Russian to reach Yakutia and meet Yakuts. He returned up the Lena until it became too rocky and shallow, and by land reached Angara. In this way, Pyanda may have become the first Russian to meet Buryats. He built new boats and explored some 870 miles (1,400 km) of the Angara, finally reaching Yeniseysk and discovering that the Angara (a Buryat name) and Upper Tunguska (Verkhnyaya Tunguska, as initially known by the Russian people) were one and the same river.

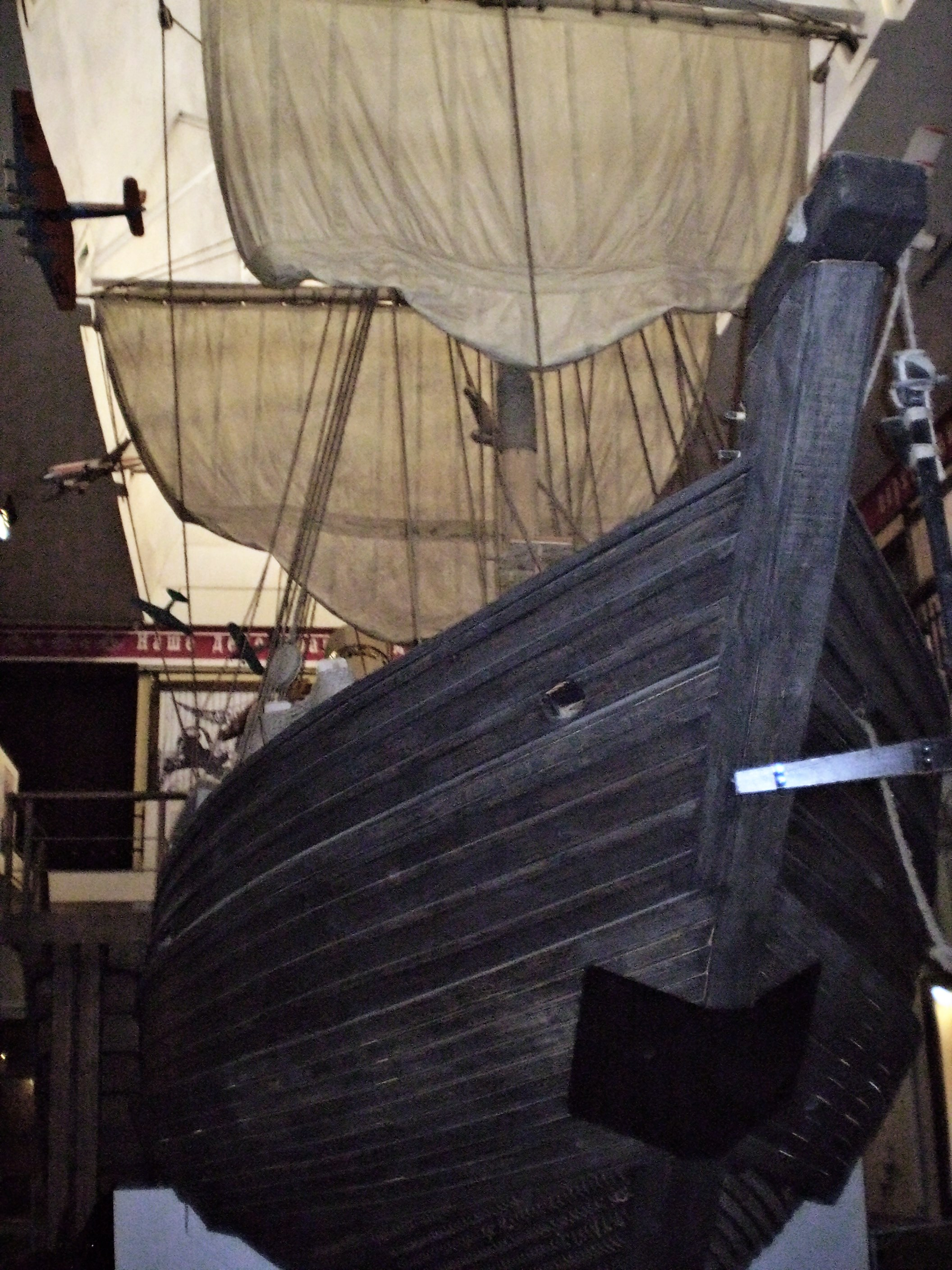
A 17th-century koch in a museum in Krasnoyarsk. Kochs were the earliest icebreakers and were widely used by Russian people in the Arctic and on Siberian rivers.

In 1627, Pyotr Beketov was appointed Yenisey voevoda in Siberia. He successfully carried out the voyage to collect taxes from Zabaykalye Buryats, becoming the first Russian to enter Buryatia. There he founded the first Russian settlement, Rybinsky ostrog. Beketov was sent to the Lena River in 1631, where in 1632 he founded Yakutsk and sent his Cossacks to explore the Aldan and further down the Lena, to found new fortresses, and to collect taxes.

Yakutsk soon turned into a major base for further Russian expeditions eastward, southward and northward. Maksim Perfilyev, who earlier had been one of the founders of Yeniseysk, founded Bratsky ostrog in 1631, and in 1638 he became the first Russian to enter Transbaikal. In 1639, a group led by Ivan Moskvitin became the first Russian to reach the Pacific Ocean and to discover the Sea of Okhotsk, having built a winter camp on its shore at the Ulya River mouth. The Cossacks learned from the locals about the proximity of the Amur River. In 1640, they apparently sailed south, explored the south-eastern shores of the Okhotsk Sea, maybe even reaching the mouth of the Amur River and discovering the Shantar Islands on their return voyage. Based on Moskvitin's account, Kurbat Ivanov draw the first Russian map of the Far East in 1642. He led a group of Cossacks himself in 1643 to the south of the Baikal Mountains and discovered Lake Baikal, visiting its Olkhon Island. Subsequently, Ivanov made the first chart and description of Baikal.

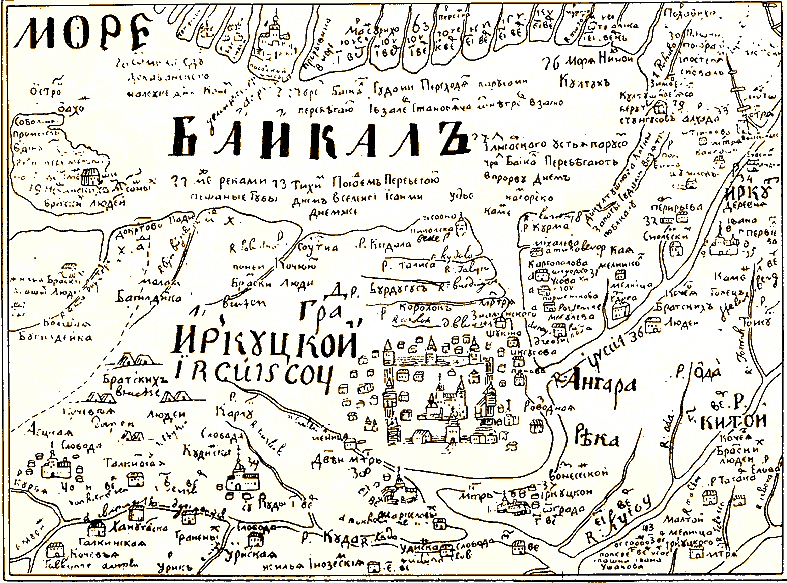
An antique map of Irkutsk and Lake Baikal in its neighbourhood

In 1643, Vasily Poyarkov crossed the Stanovoy Range and reached the upper Zeya River in the country of the Daurs, who were paying tribute to the Manchus. After wintering, in 1644, Poyarkov pushed down the Zeya and became the first Russian to reach the Amur River. He sailed down the Amur and finally discovered the mouth of that great river from land. Since his Cossacks provoked the enmity of the locals behind, Poyarkov chose a different way back. They built boats and in 1645, sailed along the Sea of Okhotsk coast to the Ulya River and spent the next winter in the huts that had been built by Ivan Moskvitin six years earlier. In 1646, they returned to Yakutsk.

In 1644, Mikhail Stadukhin discovered the Kolyma River and founded Srednekolymsk. A merchant named Fedot Alekseyev Popov organized a further expedition eastward, and Dezhnyov became a captain of one of the kochi. In 1648, they sailed from Srednekolymsk down to the Arctic and after some time they rounded Cape Dezhnyov, thus becoming the first explorers to pass through Bering Strait and to discover Chukotka and the Bering Sea. All their kochi and most of their men (including Popov) were lost in storms and clashes with the natives. A small group led by Dezhnyov reached the mouth of the Anadyr River and sailed up it in 1649, having built new boats out of the wreckage. They founded Anadyrsk and were stranded there, until Stadukhin found them, coming from Kolyma by land. Later Stadukhin set off to the south in 1651 and discovered Penzhin Bay on the northern side of the Okhotsk Sea. He also may have explored the western shores of Kamchatka as early as the 1650s.

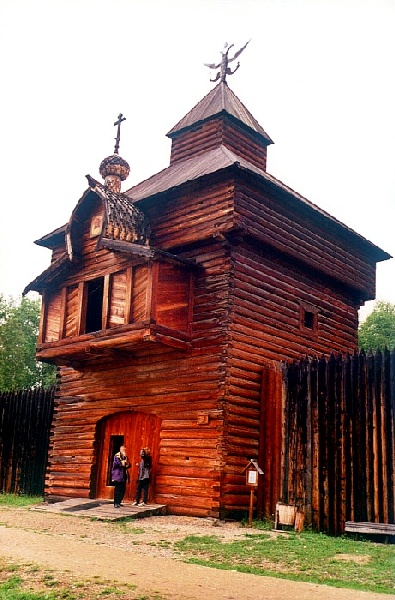
The tower of the 17th-century Russian Ilimsky ostrog, now in Taltsy Museum in Irkutsk, Siberia.

In 1649–1650, Yerofey Khabarov became the second Russian to explore the Amur River. Through the Olyokma, Tungur, and Shilka Rivers he reached the Amur (Dauriya), returned to Yakutsk and then went back to the Amur with a larger force in 1650–1653. This time he was met with armed resistance. He built winter quarters at Albazin, then sailed down the Amur and found Achansk, which preceded the present-day Khabarovsk, defeating or evading large armies of Daurs, Manchus, Chinese, and Koreans on his way. He charted the Amur in his Draft of the Amur river.

In 1659–1665, Kurbat Ivanov was the next head of Anadyrsky ostrog after Semyon Dezhnyov. In 1660, he sailed from Anadyr Bay to Cape Dezhnyov. Atop his earlier pioneering charts, he is credited with creation of the early map of Chukotka and Bering Strait, which was the first to show on paper (very schematically) the yet undiscovered Wrangel Island, both Diomede Islands and Alaska.

So, by the mid-17th century, the Russian people had established the borders of their country close to the modern ones, and explored almost the whole of Siberia, except eastern Kamchatka and some regions north of the Arctic Circle. The conquest of Kamchatka would be completed later, in the early 18th century by Vladimir Atlasov, while the discovery of the Arctic coastline and Alaska would be nearly completed by the Great Northern Expedition in 1733–1743. The expedition allowed cartographers to create a map of most of the northern coastline of Russia, thanks to the results brought by a series of voyages led by Fyodor Minin, Dmitry Ovtsyn, Vasili Pronchishchev, Semyon Chelyuskin, Dmitry Laptev, and Khariton Laptev. At the same time, some of the members of the newly founded Russian Academy of Sciences traveled extensively through Siberia, forming the so-called Academic Squad of the Expedition. They were Johann Georg Gmelin, Daniel Gottlieb Messerschmidt, and others, who became the first scientific explorers of Siberia.

=== Russian people and Siberian natives ===
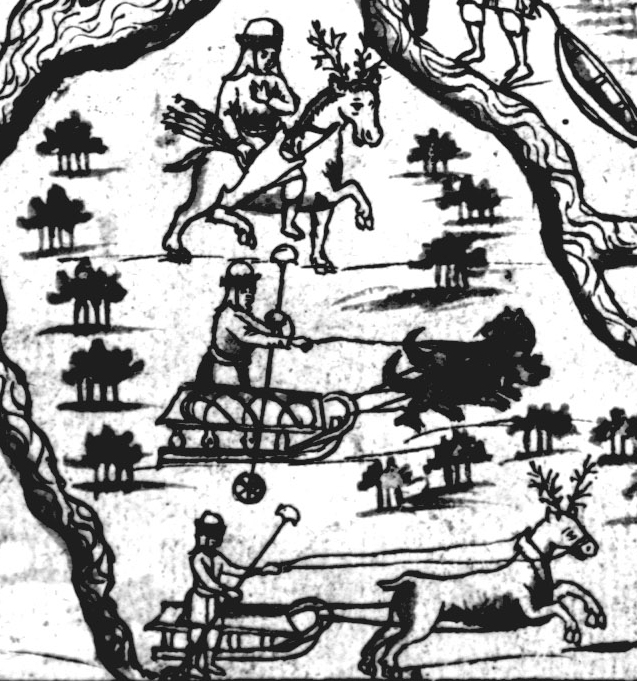
Siberian peoples as depicted in the 17th-century Remezov Letopis.

The main treasure to attract Cossacks to Siberia was the fur of sables, foxes, and ermines. Explorers brought back many furs from their expeditions. Local people, submitting to the Russian Empire, received defense from the southern nomads. In exchange they were obliged to pay yasak (tribute) in the form of furs. There was a set of yasachnaya roads, used to transport yasak to Moscow.

A number of peoples showed open resistance to Russian people. Others submitted and even requested to be subordinated, though sometimes they later refused to pay yasak, or not admitted to the Russian authority. Close reading of the earliest Russian maps of Siberia reveals indigenous groups that did not submit to tsarist authority or pay yasak.

There is evidence of collaboration and assimilation of Russian people with the local peoples in Siberia. Though the more Russian people advanced to the East, the less developed the local people were, and the more resistance they offered. In 1607–1610, the Tungus fought strenuously for their independence, but were subdued around 1623. The Buryats also offered some opposition, but were swiftly pacified. The most resistance was offered by the Koryaks (on the Kamchatka Peninsula) and Chukchi (on the Chukchi Peninsula), the latter still being at the Stone Age level of development. Resistance by local people may have been the result of forced unfair terms, that recorders would have benefitted from omitting.

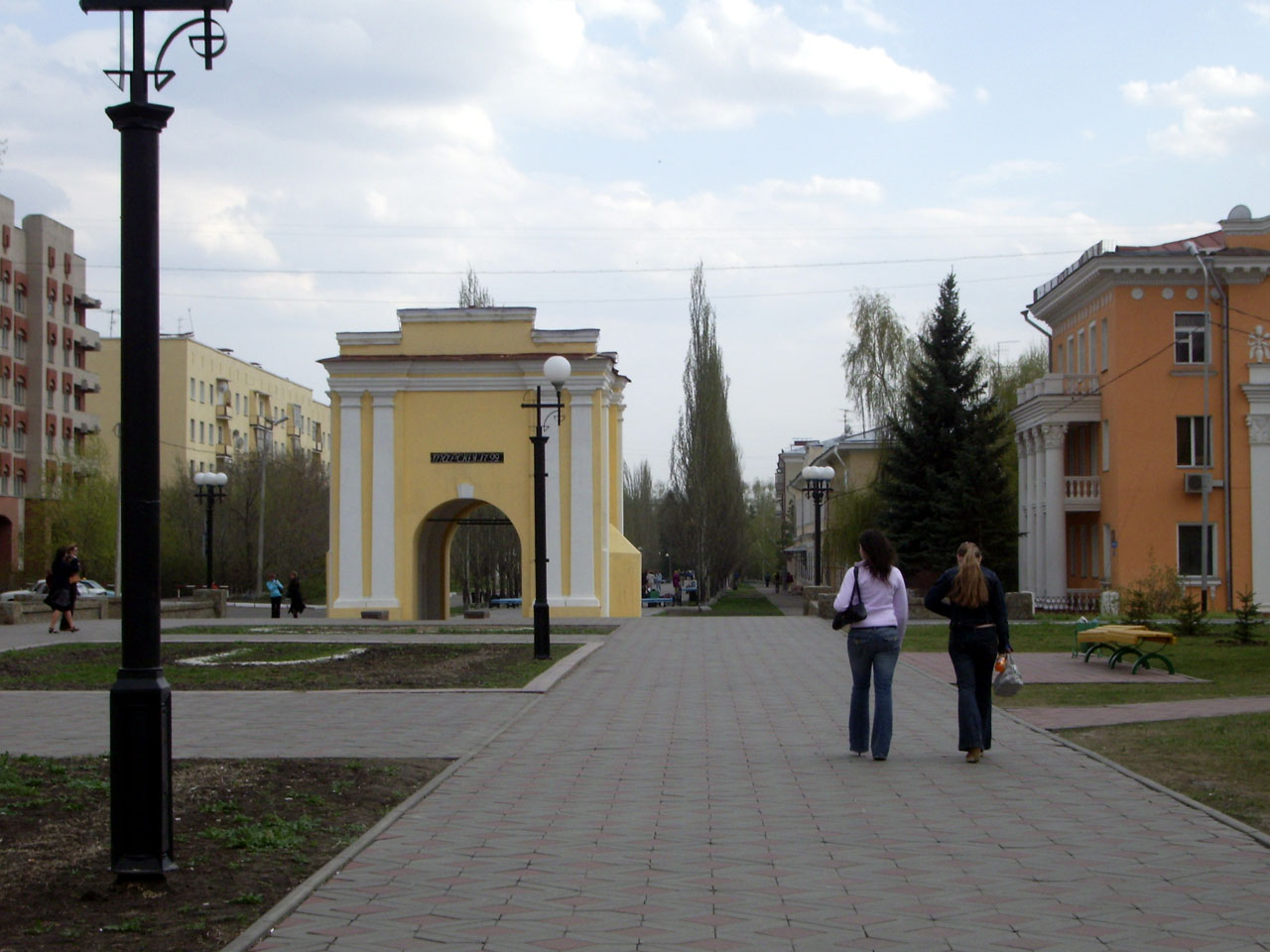
Tara Gate in Omsk city, formerly a part of the Omsk fortress

The Manchu resistance, however, obliged the Russian Cossacks to quit Albazin, and by the Treaty of Nerchinsk (1689) Russia abandoned her advance into the basin of the river, instead concentrating on the colonisation of the vast expanses of Siberia and trading with China via the Siberian trakt. In 1852, a Russian military expedition under Nikolay Muravyov explored the Amur. By 1857, a chain of Russian Cossacks and peasants were settled along the whole course of the river. The accomplished fact was recognized by China in 1860 by the Treaty of Aigun.

=== Scientists in Siberia ===
The scientific exploration of Siberia, commenced in the period of 1720 to 1742 by Daniel Gottlieb Messerschmidt, Johann Georg Gmelin, and Louis de l'Isle de la Croyère, was followed up by Gerhard Friedrich Müller, Johann Eberhard Fischer, and Johann Gottlieb Georgi. Peter Simon Pallas, with several Russian students, laid the first foundation of a thorough exploration of the topography, fauna, flora, and inhabitants of the country. The journeys of Christopher Hansteen and Georg Adolf Erman were the most important step in the exploration of the territory. Alexander von Humboldt, Christian Gottfried Ehrenberg, and Gustav Rose also paid short visits to Siberia, which gave a new impulse to the accumulation of scientific knowledge; while Carl Ritter elaborated in his Asien (1832–1859) the foundations of a sound knowledge of the structure of Siberia. Aleksandr Fyodorovich Middendorf's journey (1843–1845) to north-eastern Siberia — contemporaneous with Matthias Castrén's journeys for the special study of the Ural-Altaic languages — directed attention to the far north and awakened interest in the Amur, the basin of which soon became the scene of the expeditions of Akhte and Schwarz (1852), and later on of the Siberian expedition, advanced knowledge of East Siberia.

The Siberian branch of the Russian Geographical Society was founded at the same time in Irkutsk, and afterwards became a permanent centre for the exploration of Siberia; while the opening of the Amur and Sakhalin attracted Richard Maack, Schmidt, Glehn, Gustav Radde, and Leopold von Schrenck, who created works on the flora, fauna, and inhabitants of Siberia.

=== Russian settlement ===
Siberia in 1636

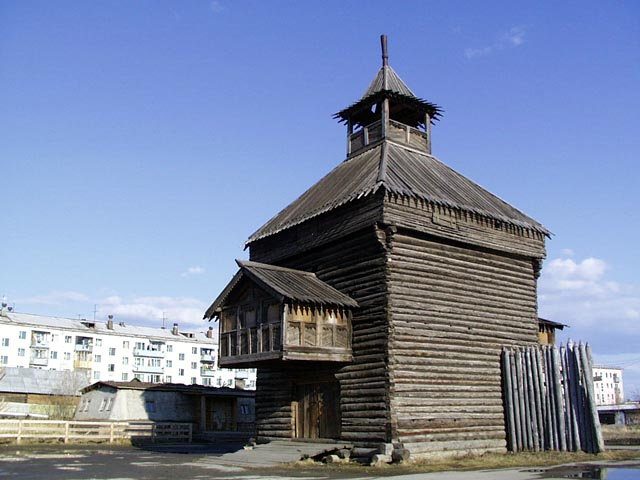
The 17th-century tower of Yakutsk fort.

In the 17th and 18th centuries, the Russian people who migrated into Siberia were hunters, and those who had escaped from Central Russia: fugitive peasants in search for life free of serfdom, fugitive convicts, and Old Believers. The new settlements of Russian people and the existing local peoples required defence from nomads, for which forts were founded. This way forts of Tomsk and Berdsk were founded.

In the beginning of the 18th century, the threat of the nomads' attacks weakened; thus the region became more and more populated; normal civic life was established in the cities. A new administrative guberniya was formed with Irkutsk, then in the 19th century the territory was several times re-divided with creation of new guberniyas: Tomsk (with center in Tomsk) and Yenisei (Yeniseysk, later Krasnoyarsk).

In 1730, the first large industrial project — the metallurgical production found by Demidov family — gave birth to the city of Barnaul. Later, the enterprise organized social institutions like library, club, theatre. Pyotr Semenov-Tyan-Shansky, who stayed in Barnaul in 1856–1857, wrote: "The richness of mining engineers of Barnaul expressed not merely in their households and clothes, but more in their educational level, knowledge of science and literature. Barnaul was undoubtedly the most cultured place in Siberia, and I've called it Siberian Athenes, leaving Sparta for Omsk".

The same events took place in other cities; public libraries, museums of local lore, colleges, theatres were being built, although the first university in Siberia was opened as late as 1880 in Tomsk.

Siberian peasants more than those in European Russia relied on their own force and abilities. They had to fight against the harder climate without outside help. Absence of serfdom and landlords also contributed to their independent character. Unlike peasants in European Russia, Siberians had no problems with land availability; the low population density gave them the ability to intensively cultivate a plot for several years in a row, then to leave it fallow for a long time and cultivate other plots. Siberian peasants had an abundance of food, while Central Russian peasantry had to moderate their families' appetites. Leonid Blummer noted that the culture of alcohol consumption differed significantly; Siberian peasants drank frequently but moderately: "For a Siberian vodka isn't a wonder, unlike for a Russian peasant, which, having reached it after all this time, is ready to drink a sea." The houses, according to travellers' notes, were unlike the typical Russian izbas: the houses were big, often two-floored, the ceilings were high, the walls were covered with boards and painted with oil-paint.

== Russian Empire ==
=== Administrative divisions ===
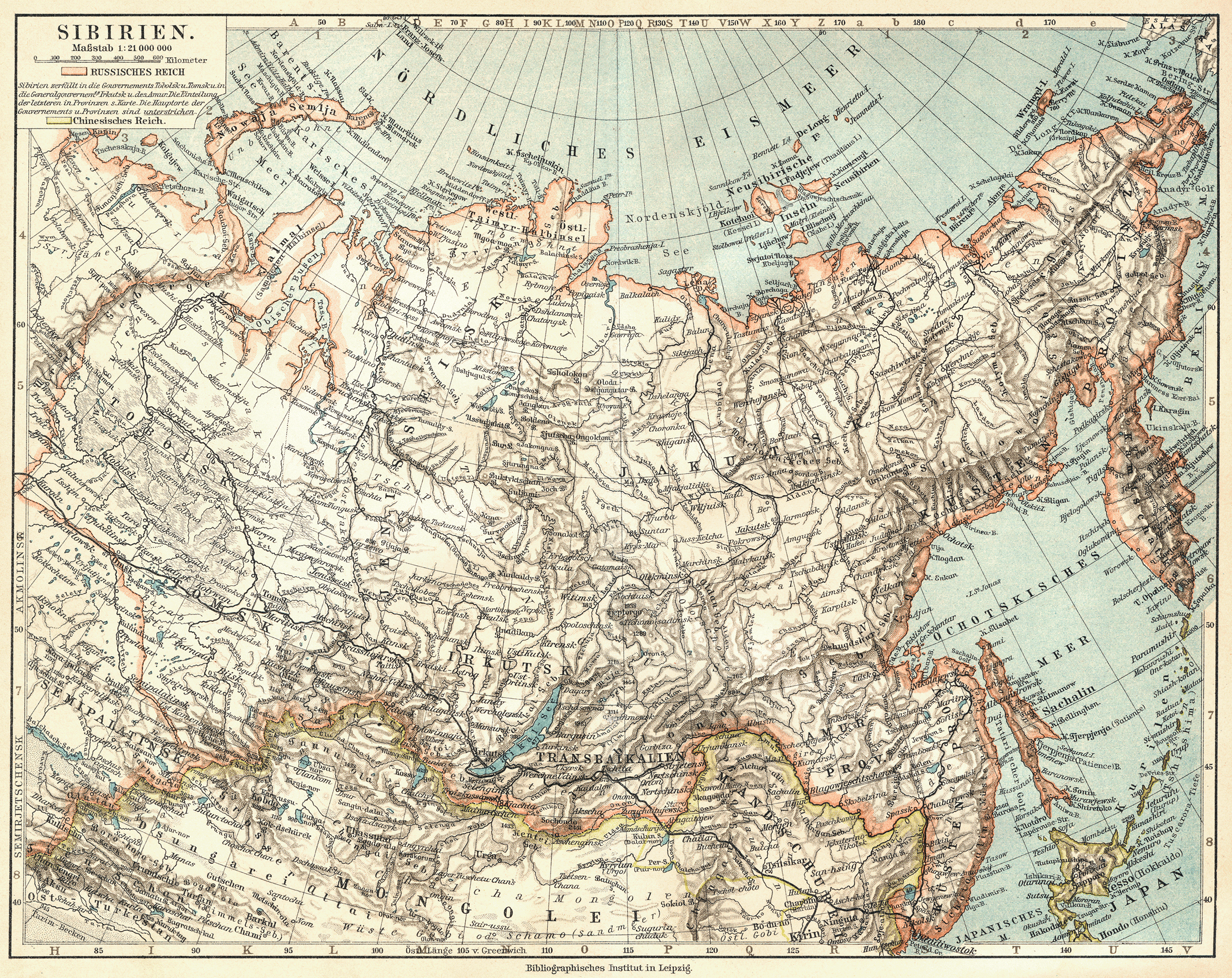
1905 map of Siberia

The Siberia Governorate was established in 1708 as part of the administrative reforms of Peter I. In 1719, the governorate was divided into three provinces, Vyatka, Solikamsk and Tobolsk. In 1762, it was renamed to Tsardom of Siberia (Сибирское царство). In 1782, under the impression of Pugachev's Rebellion, the Siberian kingdom was divided into three separate viceregencies (наместничество), centered at Tobolsk, Irkutsk, and Kolyvan. These viceregencies were downgraded to the status of governorate in 1796 (Tobolsk Governorate, Irkutsk Governorate, and Vyatka Governorate). Tomsk Governorate was split off Tobolsk governorate in 1804. Yakutsk Oblast was split off Irkutsk Governorate in 1805. In 1822, the subdivision of Siberia was reformed again. It was divided into two governorates general, West Siberia and East Siberia. West Siberia comprised the Tobolsk and Tomsk governorates, and East Siberia comprised Irkutsk Governorate, and the newly formed Yeniseysk Governorate.

=== Decembrists and other exiles ===
Siberia was deemed a good place to exile for political reasons, as it was far from any foreign country. A Saint Petersburg citizen would not wish to escape in the vast Siberian countryside as the peasants and criminals did. Even the larger cities such as Irkutsk, Omsk, and Krasnoyarsk, lacked that intensive social life and luxurious high life of the capital.

About eighty people involved in the Decembrist revolt were sentenced to obligatory work in Siberia and perpetual settlement here. Eleven wives followed them and settled near the labor camps. In their memoirs, they noted benevolence and prosperity of rural Siberians and severe treatment by the soldiers and officers.

"Travelling through Siberia, I was wondered and fascinated at every step by the cordiality and hospitality I met everywhere. I was fascinated by the richness and the abundance, with which the people live until today (1861), but that time there was even more expanse in everything. The hospitality was especially developed in Siberia. Everywhere we were received like being in friendly countries, everywhere we were fed well, and when I asked how much I owed them, they didn't want to take anything, saying "Put a candle to the God"."

"...Siberia is an extremely rich country, the land is unusually fruitful, and little work is needed to get a plentiful harvest."

Polina Annenkova, Notes of a Decembrist's Wife

A number of Decembrists died of diseases, some suffered psychological shock and even went out of their mind.

After completing the term of obligatory work, they were sentenced to settle in specific small towns and villages. There, some started doing business, which was well permitted. Only several years later, in the 1840s, they were allowed to move to big cities or to settle anywhere in Siberia. Only in 1856, 31 years after the revolt, Alexander II pardoned and restituted the Decembrists in honour of his coronation.

Living in the cities of Omsk, Krasnoyarsk, and Irkutsk, the Decembrists contributed extensively to the social life and culture. In Irkutsk, their houses are now museums. In many places, memorial plaques with their names have been installed.

Yet, there were exceptions: Vladimir Rayevsky was arrested for participation in Decembrists' circles in 1822 and was exiled to Olonki village near Irkutsk in 1828. There he married and had nine children, traded with bread, and founded a school for children and adults to teach arithmetic and grammar. Being pardoned by Alexander II, he visited his native town, but returned to Olonki.

Despite the wishes of the central authorities, the exiled revolutionaries unlikely felt outcast in Siberia. Quite the contrary, Siberians having lived all the time on their own, "didn't feel tenderness" to the authorities. In many cases, the exiled were cordially received and got paid positions.

Fyodor Dostoevsky was exiled to katorga near Omsk and to military service in Semipalatinsk. In the service, he also had to make trips for Barnaul and Kuznetsk, where he married.

Anton Chekhov was not exiled, but in 1890 made a trip on his own to Sakhalin through Siberia and visited a katorga there. In his trip, he visited Tomsk, speaking disapprovingly about it, then Krasnoyarsk, which he called "the most beautiful Siberian city". He noted that despite being more a place of criminal rather than political exile, the moral atmosphere was much better: he did not face any case of theft. Blummer suggested to prepare a gun, but his attendant replied: What for?! We are not in Italy, you know. Chekhov observed that besides of the evident prosperity, there was an urgent demand for cultural development.

Many Poles were also exiled to Siberia (see Sybirak). In 1866, they incited the Baikal Insurrection.

=== Trans-Siberian Railway ===
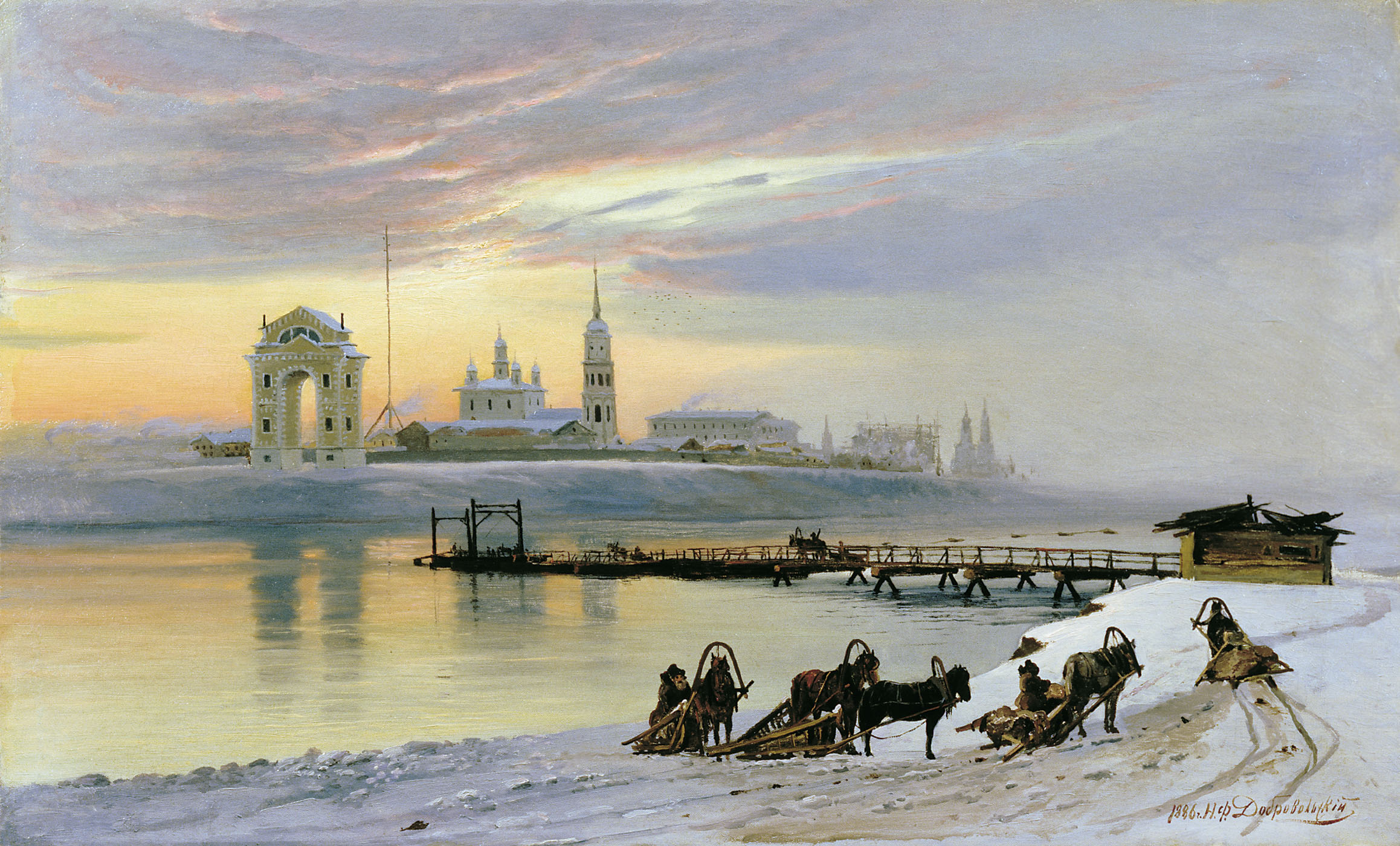
Crossing the Angara at Irkutsk (1886).

The development of Siberia was hampered by poor transportation links within the region as well as between Siberia and the rest of the country. Aside from the Sibirsky trakt, good roads suitable for wheeled transport were few and far apart. For about five months of the year, rivers were the main means of transportation; during the cold half of the year, cargo and passengers travelled by horse-drawn sleds over the winter roads, many of which were the same rivers, now ice-covered.

The first steamboat on the Ob, Nikita Myasnikov's Osnova, was launched in 1844; but the early starts were difficult, and it was not until 1857 that steamboat shipping started developing in the Ob system in the serious way. Steamboats started operating on the Yenisei in 1863, on the Lena and Amur in the 1870s.

While the comparably flat Western Siberia was at least fairly well served by the gigantic Ob–Irtysh–Tobol–Chulym river system, the mighty rivers of Eastern Siberia – Yenisei, Upper Angara (Angara below Bratsk was not easily navigable because of the rapids), and Lena — were mostly navigable only in the north–south direction. An attempt to somewhat remedy the situation by building the Ob–Yenisei Canal were not particularly successful. Only a railroad could be a real solution to the region's transportation problems.

The first projects of railroads in Siberia emerged since the creation of the Moscow–Saint Petersburg railroad. One of the first was Irkutsk–Chita project, intended to connect the former to the Amur River and, consequently, to the Pacific Ocean.

Prior to 1880, the central government seldom responded to such projects, due to weakness of Siberian enterprises, fear of Siberian territories' integration with the Pacific region rather than with Russia, and thus falling under the influence of the United States and Great Britain. The heavy and clumsy bureaucracy and the fear of financial risks also contributed to the inaction: the financial system always underestimated the effects of the railway, assuming that it would take only the existing traffic.

Mainly the fear of losing Siberia convinced Alexander II in 1880 to make a decision to build the railway. Construction started in 1891.

The Trans-Siberian Railroad gave a great boost to Siberian agriculture, allowing for increased exports to Central Russia and European countries. It pushed not only the territories closest to the railway, but also those connected with meridional rivers, such as the Ob (Altai) and the Yenisei (Minusinsk and Abakan regions).

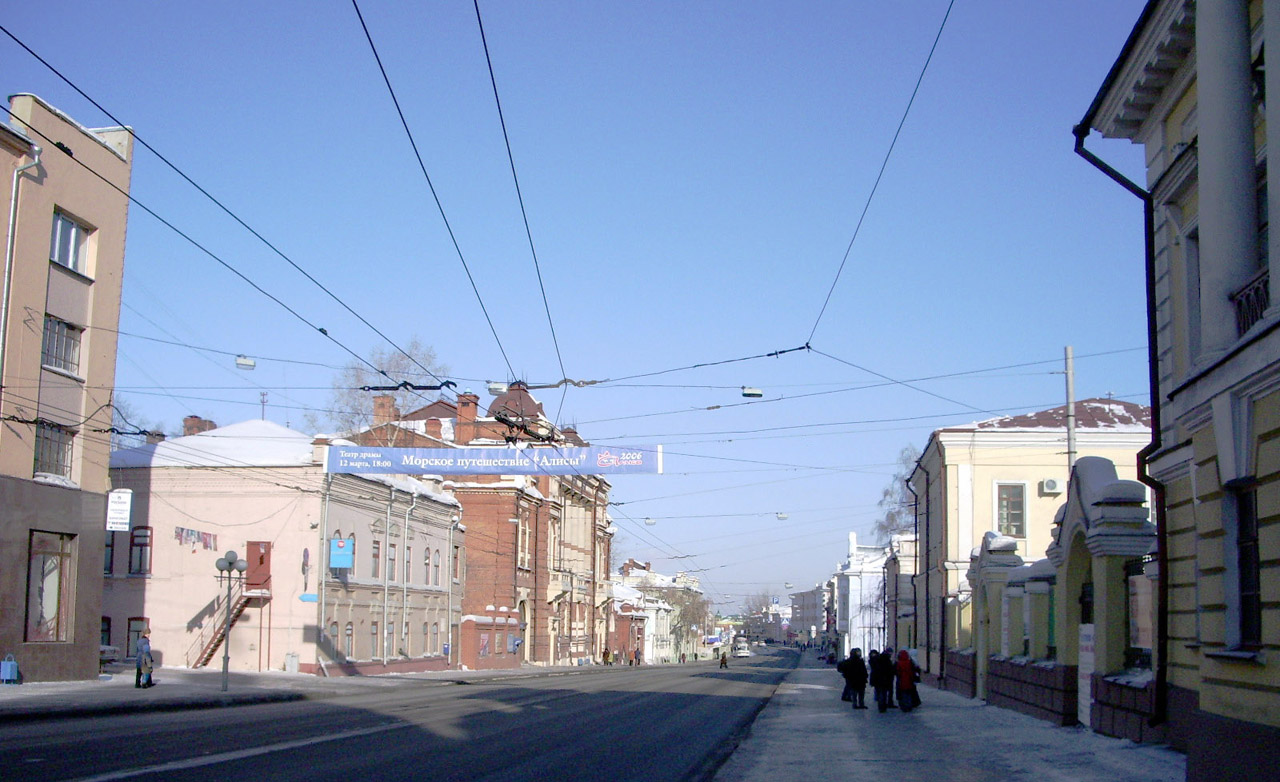
Tomsk was the largest Siberian city by the end of the 19th century, but was left aside of the Trans-Siberian Railway.

Siberian agriculture exported a lot of cheap grain to the west. The agriculture in Central Russia was still under pressure of serfdom, formally abandoned in 1861. Another profitable industry is the fur trade, which contributed greatly to the national revenue on top of covering administrative costs in Siberia.

Thus, to defend it and to prevent possible social destabilization, in 1896 (when the eastern and western parts of the Trans-Siberian did not close up yet), the government introduced Chelyabinsk tariff break—a tariff barrier for grain in Chelyabinsk, and a similar barrier in Manchuria. This measure changed the form of cereal product export: mills emerged in Altai, Novosibirsk, and Tomsk; many farms switched to butter production. From 1896 to 1913, Siberia on average exported 30.6 million poods (~500,000 tonnes) of cereal products (grain, flour) annually.

=== Stolypin's resettlement programme ===
One early significant settlement campaign was carried out under Nicholas II by Prime Minister Stolypin in 1906–1911.

The rural areas of Central Russia were overcrowded, while the East was still lightly populated despite having fertile lands. On 10 May 1906, by the decree of the Tsar, agriculturalists were granted the right to transfer, without any restrictions, to the Asian territories of Russia, and to obtain cheap or free land. A large advertising campaign was conducted: six million copies of brochures and banners entitled "What the resettlement gives to peasants", and "How the peasants in Siberia live" were printed and distributed in rural areas. Special propaganda trains were sent throughout the countryside, and transport trains were provided for the migrants. The state gave loans to the settlers for farm construction.

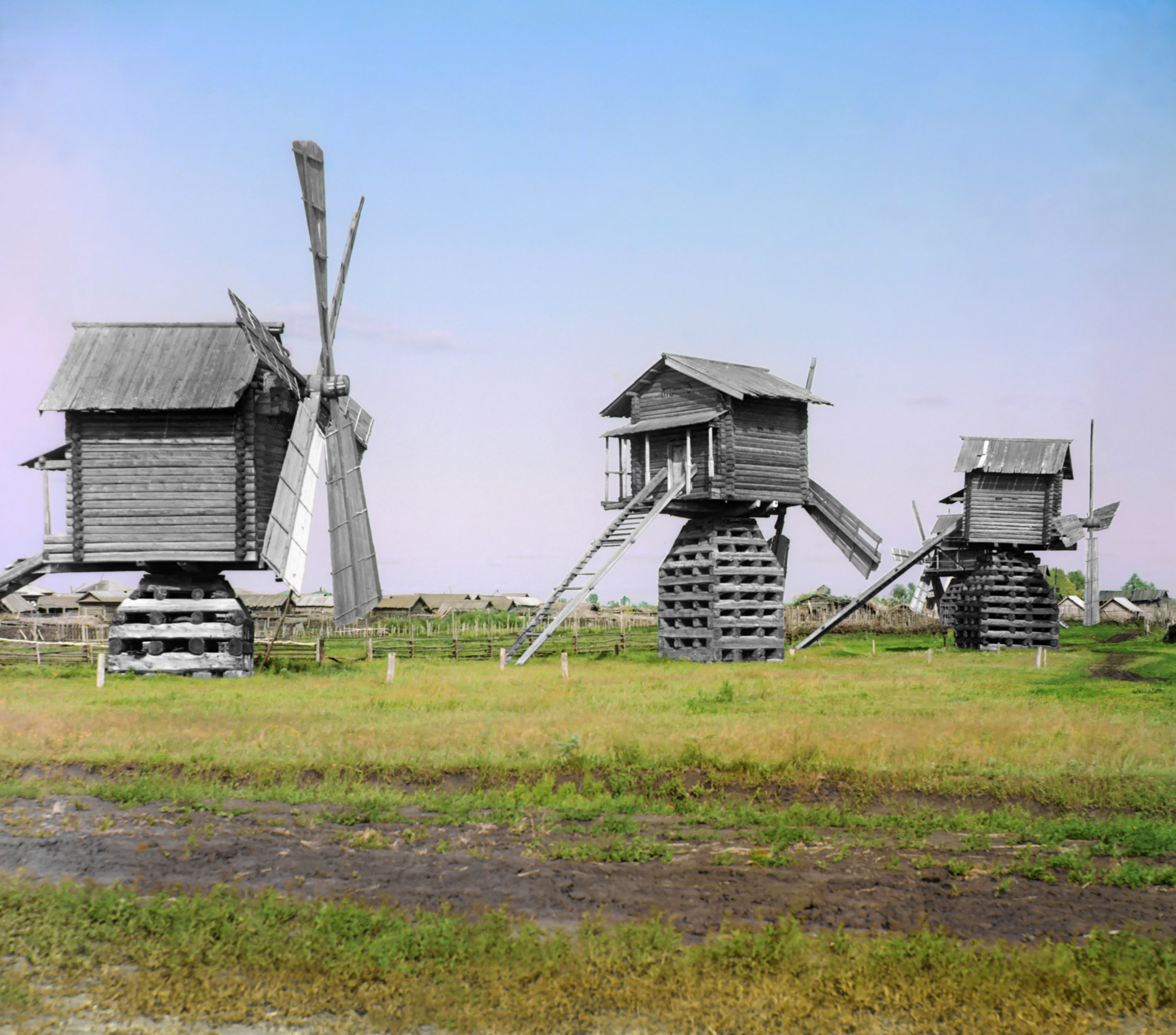
Prokudin-Gorsky's picture of windmills in Western Siberia

Not all the settlers decided to stay; 17.8% migrated back. All in all, more than three million people officially resettled to Siberia, and 750,000 came as foot-messengers. From 1897 to 1914, the Siberian population increased 73%, and the area of land under cultivation doubled.

=== Tunguska event ===
The Tunguska event, or Tunguska explosion, was a powerful explosion that occurred near the Podkamennaya (Lower Stony) Tunguska River in what is now Krasnoyarsk Krai of Russia, at around 7:14 a.m. (0:14 UT, 7:02 a.m. local solar time) on 30 June 1908 (June 17 in the Julian calendar, in use locally at the time).

The cause of the explosion is controversial, and still much disputed to this day. Although the cause of the explosion is the subject of debate, it is commonly believed to have been caused by a meteor air burst: the atmospheric explosion of a large meteoroid or comet fragment at an altitude of 5–10 kilometres (3.1–6.2 miles) above the Earth's surface. Different studies have yielded varying estimates of the object's size, with general agreement that it was a few tens of metres across.

Although the Tunguska event is believed to be the largest impact event on land in Earth's recent history, impacts of similar size in remote ocean areas would have gone unnoticed before the advent of global satellite monitoring in the 1960s and 1970s. Because the event occurred in a remote area, there was little damage to human life or property, and it was in fact some years until it was properly investigated.

The first recorded expedition arrived at the scene more than a decade after the event. In 1921, the Russian mineralogist Leonid Kulik, visiting the Podkamennaya Tunguska River basin as part of a survey for the Soviet Academy of Sciences, deduced from local accounts that the explosion had been caused by a giant meteorite impact. He persuaded the Soviet government to fund an expedition to the Tunguska region, based on the prospect of meteoric iron that could be salvaged to aid Soviet industry.

Kulik's party reached the site in 1927. To their surprise, no crater was to be found. There was instead a region of scorched trees about 50 kilometres (31 mi) across. A few near ground zero were still strangely standing upright, their branches and bark stripped off. Those farther away had been knocked down in a direction away from the center.

== Russian Civil War ==
By the time of the revolution, Siberia was an agricultural region of Russia, with weak entrepreneur and industrial classes. The intelligentsia had vague political ideas. Only 13% of the region's population lived in the cities and possessed some political knowledge. The lack of strong social differences and scarcity of urban population and intellectuals led to the uniting of formally different political parties under ideas of regionalism.

The anti-Bolshevik forces failed to offer a united resistance. While Alexander Kolchak fought against the Bolsheviks intending to eliminate them in the capital of the Empire, the local Socialist-Revolutionaries and Mensheviks tried to sign a peace treaty with the Bolsheviks, on terms of independence. Foreign allies, though being able to make a decisive effort, preferred to stay neutral, although Kolchak himself rejected the offer of help from Japan.

After a series of defeats in Central Russia, Kolchak's forces retreated to Siberia. Amid resistance of Socialist-Revolutionaries and waning support from the allies, the Whites had to evacuate from Omsk to Irkutsk, and finally Kolchak resigned under pressure of the Socialist-Revolutionaries, who soon submitted to the Bolsheviks.

- Siberian Republic
- Far Eastern Republic, April 1920 – November 1922
- Provisional Priamurye Government, 27 May 1921 and 16 June 1923

== Soviet era ==
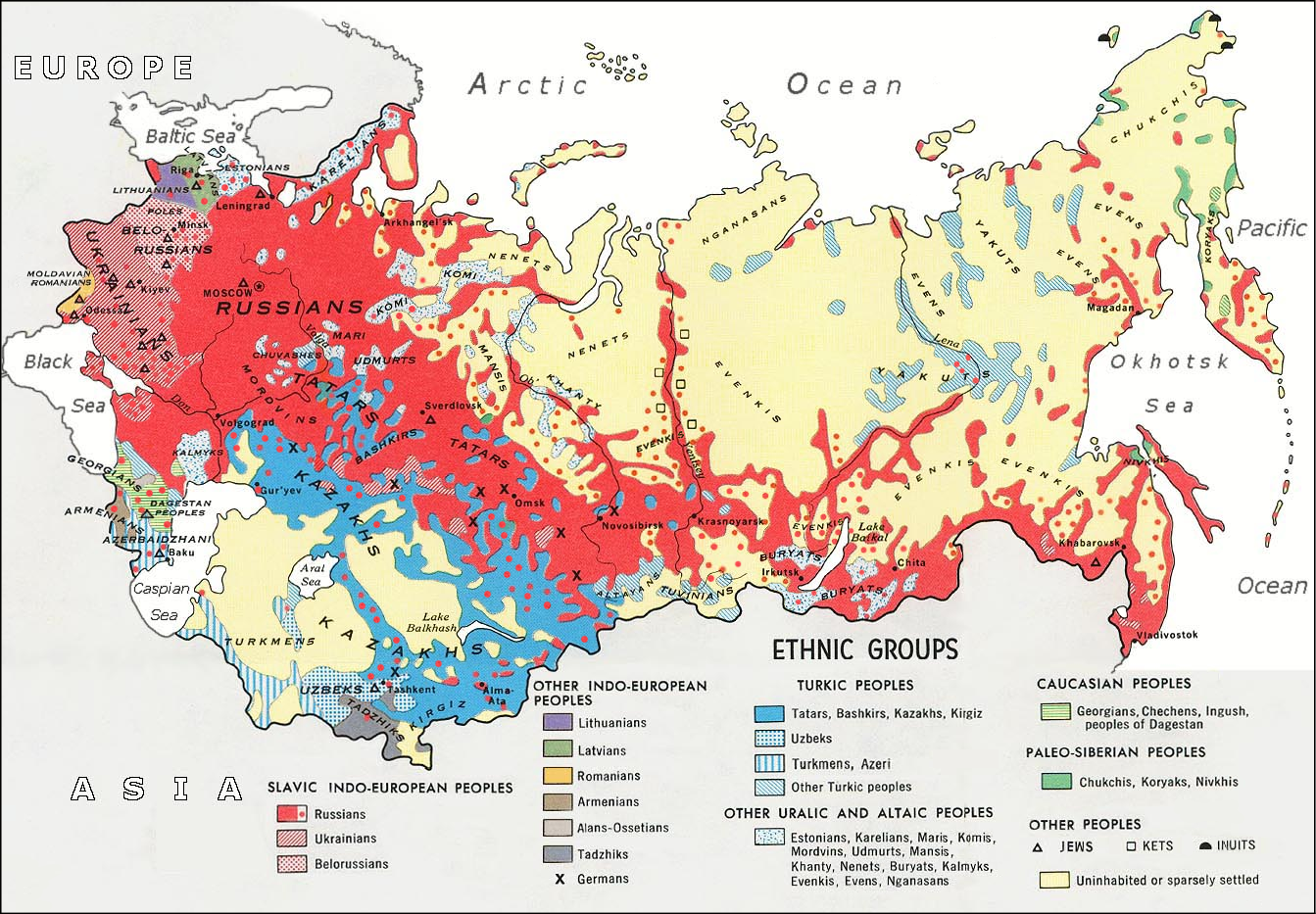
Ethnographic map of the Soviet Union, 1970

=== 1920s and 1930s ===
By the 1920s the agriculture in Siberia was in decline. With the large number of immigrants, land was used very intensively, which led to exhaustion of the land and frequent bad harvests. Agriculture was not destroyed by the civil war, but the disorganization of the exports destroyed the food industry and reduced the peasants' incomes. Furthermore, prodrazvyorstka and then the natural food tax contributed to growing discontent. In 1920–1924, there was a number of anti-communistic riots in rural areas, with up to 40,000 people involved. Both old Whites (Cossacks) and old "Reds" partisans, who earlier fought against Kolchak, the marginals, who were the major force of the Communists, took part in the riots. According to a survey of 1927 in Irkutsk Oblast, the peasants openly said they would participate in anti-Soviet rebellion and hoped for foreign help. In 1929, one such anti-Soviet rebellion took place in Buryatia, the rebellion was put down will the deaths of 35,000 Buryats. It should also be noticed that the KVZhD builders and workers were declared enemies of the people by a special order of the Soviet authorities.

The youth, that had socialized in the age of war, was highly militarized, and the Soviet government pushed the further military propaganda by Komsomol. There are many documented evidences of "red banditism", especially in the countryside, such as desecration of churches and Christian graves, and even murders of priests and believers. Also in many cases a Komsomol activist or an authority representative, speaking with a person opposed to the Soviets, got angry and killed him/her and anybody else. The party faintly counteracted this.

In the 1930s, the party started the collectivization, which automatically put the "kulak" label on the well-off families living in Siberia for a long time. Naturally, raskulachivanie applied to everyone who protested. From the Central Russia many families were exiled to low-populated, forest or swampy areas of Siberia, but those who lived here, had either to escape anywhere, or to be exiled in the Northern regions (such as Evenk and Khanty–Mansi Autonomous Okrugs and the northern parts of Tomsk Oblast). Collectivization destroyed the traditional and most effective stratum of the peasants in Siberia and the natural ways of development, and its consequences are still persisting.

In the cities, during the New Economic Policy and later, the new authorities, driven by the romantic socialistic ideas made attempts to build new socialistic cities, according to the fashionable constructivism movement, but after all have left only numbers of square houses. For example, the Novosibirsk Opera and Ballet Theatre was initially designed in pure constructivistic style. It was an ambitious project of exiled architects. In the mid-1930s with introduction of new classicism, it was significantly redesigned.

After the Trans-Siberian Railway was built, Omsk soon became the largest Siberian city, but the Soviets eventually favoured Novosibirsk. In the 1930s, the first heavy industrialization took place in the Kuznetsk Basin (coal mining and ferrous metallurgy) and at Norilsk (nickel and rare-earth metals). The Northern Sea Route saw industrial application. At the same time, with growing number of prisoners, the Gulag system established a large network of labour camps in Siberia.

=== World War II ===
In 1941, many enterprises and people were evacuated into Siberian cities by the railroads. In urgent need of ammunition and military equipment, they started working almost immediately after their materials and equipment were unloaded.

Most of the evacuated enterprises remained at their new sites after the war. They increased industrial production in Siberia to a great extent, and became constitutive for many cities, like Rubtsovsk. The easternmost city to receive them was Ulan-Ude, since Chita was considered dangerously close to China and Japan.

On 28 August 1941, the Supreme Soviet stated an order "About the Resettlement of the Germans of Volga region", by which many of them were deported into different rural areas of Kazakhstan and Siberia.

By the end of war, thousands of captive soldiers and officers of German and Japanese armies were sentenced to several years of work in labor camps in all the regions of Siberia. These camps were directed by a different administration than the Gulag. Although Soviet camps had not the purpose to lead prisoners to death, the death rate was significant, especially in winters. The range of works differed from vegetable farming to construction of the Baikal Amur Mainline.

=== Industrial expansion ===
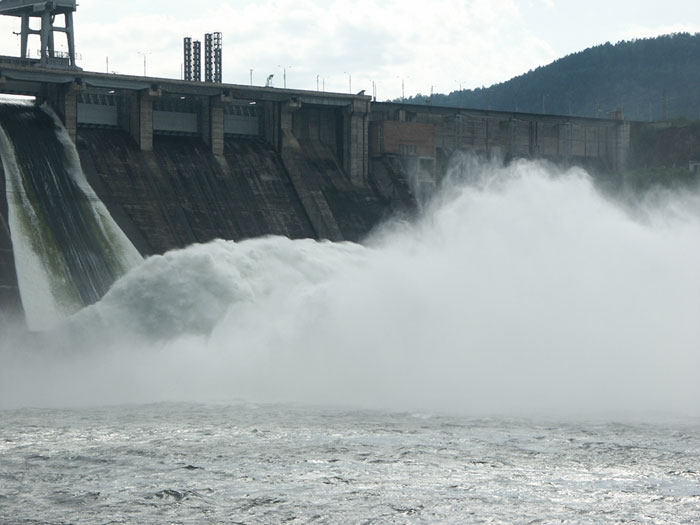
Krasnoyarsk hydroelectric power station

In the second half of the 20th century, the exploration of mineral and hydroenergetic resources continued. Many of these projects were planned, but were delayed due to wars and the ever-changing opinions of Soviet politicians.

The most famous project is the Baikal Amur Mainline. It was planned simultaneously with Trans-Siberian, but the construction began just before World War II, was put on hold during the war and restarted after. After Joseph Stalin's death, it was again suspended for years to be continued under Leonid Brezhnev.

A cascade of hydroelectric power plants was built in the 1960s–1970s on the Angara River, a project similar to Tennessee Valley Authority in the United States. The powerplants allowed creation and support of large production facilities, such as the aluminum plant in Bratsk, Ust-Ilimsk, rare-earth mining in Angara basin, and those associated with the timber industry. The price of electricity in Angara basin is the lowest in Russia. But the Angara cascade is not fully finished yet: the Boguchany power plant waits to be finished, and a series of enterprises are planned to be set up.

The downside of this development is ecological damage due to low standards of production and excessive sizes of dams (the bigger projects were favored by industrial authorities and received more funding), the increased humidity sharpened the already hard climate. Another power plant project on the Katun River in the Altai Mountains in the 1980s, which was widely protested publicly, was cancelled.

There are a number of military-oriented centers like the NPO Vektor and closed cities like Seversk. By the end of the 1980s, a large portion of the industrial production of Omsk and Novosibirsk (up to 40%) was composed of military and aviation output. The collapse of state-funded military orders began an economic crisis.

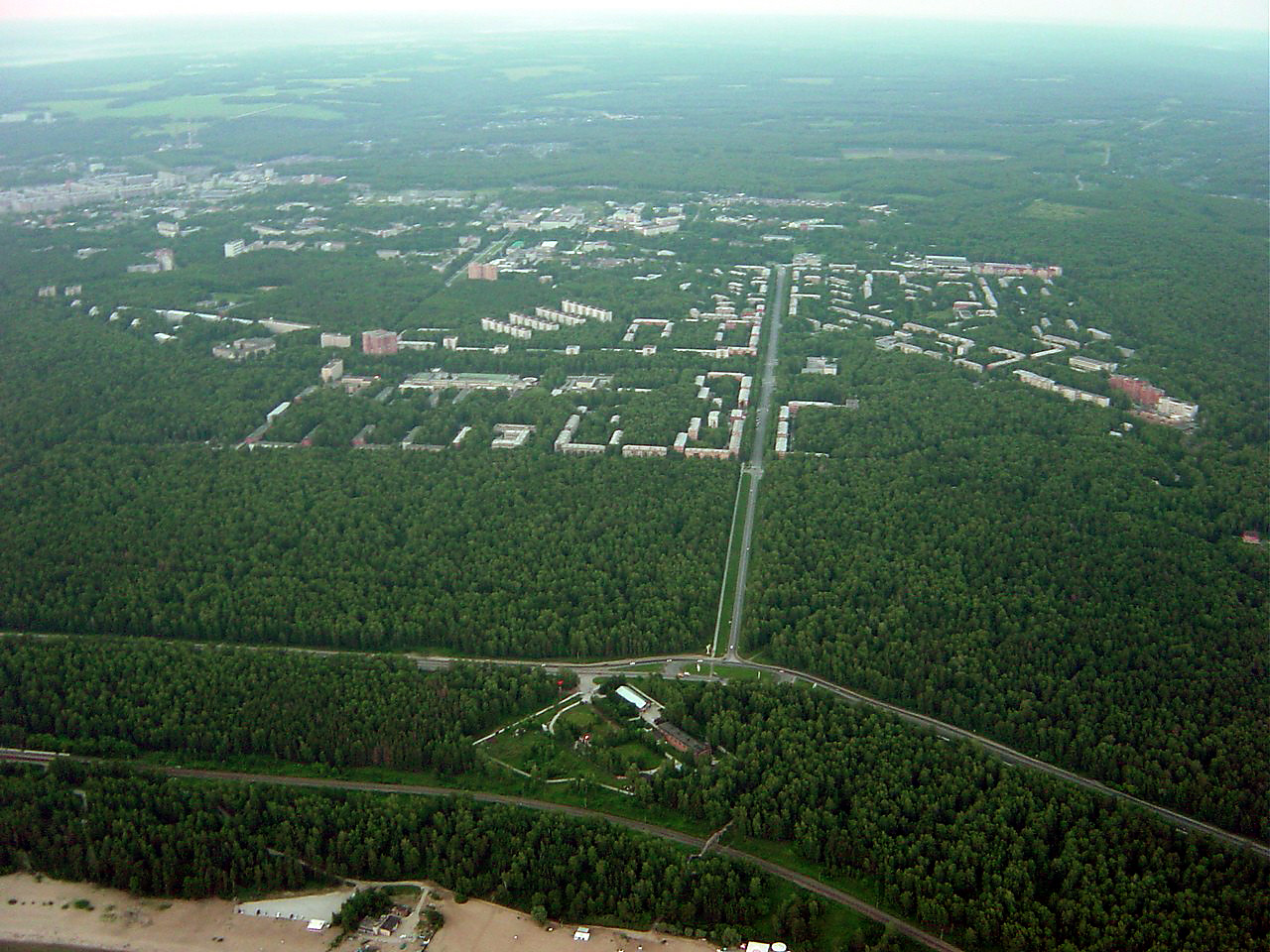
Akademgorodok, a scientific town near Novosibirsk

The Siberian Branch of the Russian Academy of Sciences unites a lot of research institutes in the biggest cities, the biggest being the Budker Institute of Nuclear Physics in Akademgorodok (a scientific town) near Novosibirsk. Other scientific towns or just districts composed by research institutes, also named "Akademgorodok", are in the cities of Tomsk, Krasnoyarsk, and Irkutsk. These sites are the centers of the newly developed IT industry, especially in that of Novosibirsk, nicknamed "Silicon Taiga", and in Tomsk.

A number of Siberian-based companies extended their businesses of various consumer products to meta-regional and an all-Russian level. Various Siberian artists and industries, have created communities that are not centralized in Moscow anymore, like the Idea (annual low-budged ads festival), Golden Capital (annual prize in architecture).

== Recent history ==
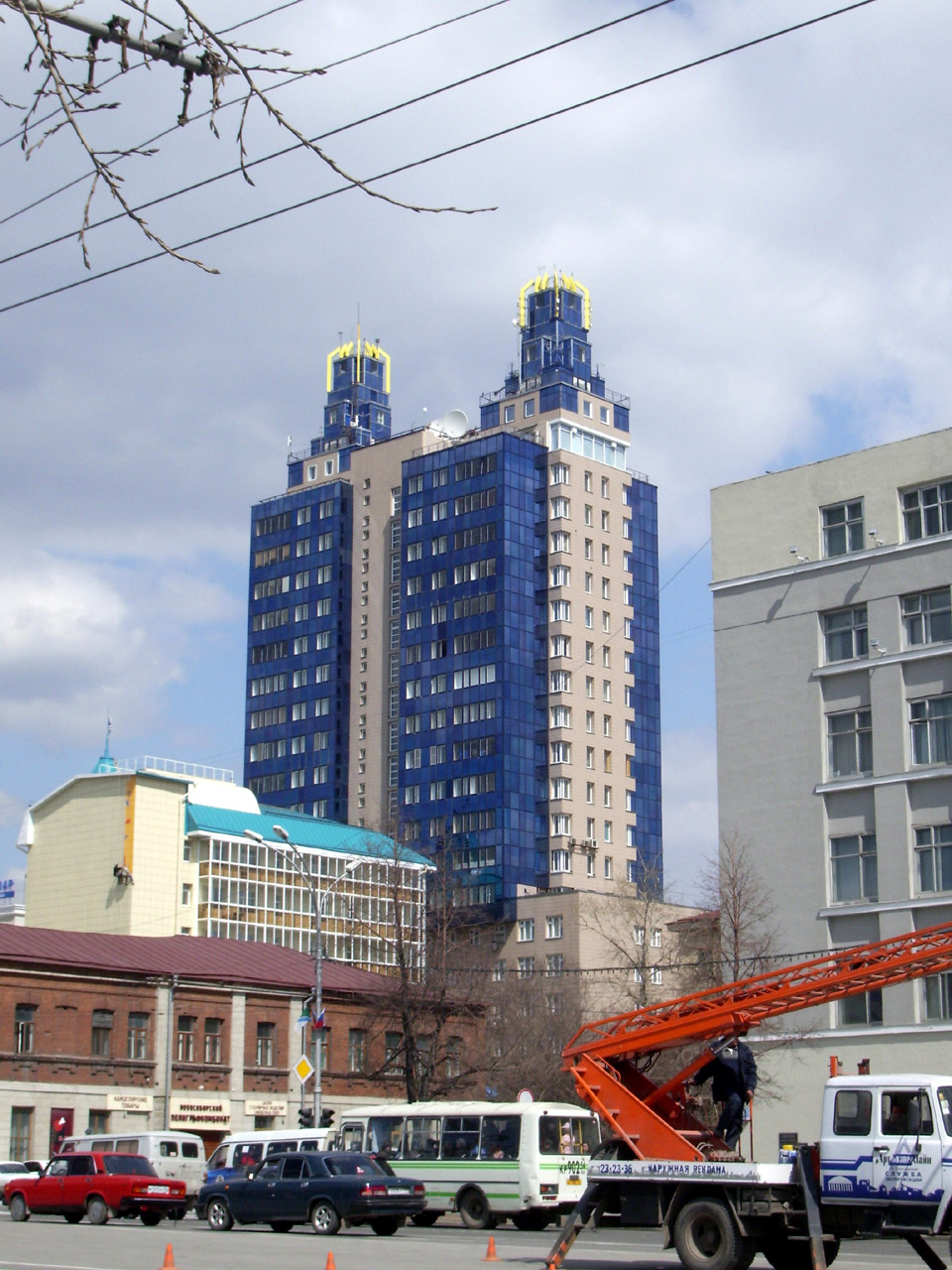
A new (2003) apartment building in Novosibirsk

Until completion of the Chita–Khabarovsk highway, the Transbaikalia was a dead end for automobile transport. While this recently constructed through road will at first benefit mostly the transit travel to and from the Pacific provinces, it will also boost settlement and industrial expansion in the sparsely populated regions of Zabaykalsky Krai and Amur Oblast.

Expansion of transportation networks will continue to define the directions of Siberian regional development. The next project to be carried out is the completion of the railroad branch to Yakutsk. Another large project, proposed already in the 19th century as a northern option for the Trans-Siberian Railway, is the Northern-Siberian Railroad between Nizhnevartovsk, Belyi Yar, Lesosibirsk, and Ust-Ilimsk. The Russian Railroads instead suggest an ambitious project of a railway to Magadan, Chukchi Peninsula and then the supposed Bering Strait Tunnel to Alaska.

While the Russians continue to migrate from the Siberian and Far Eastern Federal Districts to Western Russia, the Siberian cities attract labour (legal or illegal) from the Central Asian republics and from China. While the natives are aware of the situation, in Western Russia myths about thousands and millions of Chinese living in the Transbaikalia and the Far East are widespread.

== See also ==
- Age of Discovery
- Education in Siberia
- Explorers of Siberia
- Ket people
- List of Sibir khans
- Russian conquest of Siberia
- Trans-Siberian Railway

Cities in Siberia

- Timeline of Novosibirsk
- Timeline of Omsk

== Sources ==
- Lazaridis; Belfer-Cohen, Anna; Mallick, Swapan; et al. (2018). "Paleolithic DNA from the Caucasus reveals core of West Eurasian ancestry". bioRxiv 10.1101/423079.
- Moreno-Mayar, J. Víctor; Potter, Ben A.; Vinner, Lasse; Steinrücken, Matthias; Rasmussen, Simon; Terhorst, Jonathan; Kamm, John A.; Albrechtsen, Anders; Malaspinas, Anna-Sapfo; Sikora, Martin; Reuther, Joshua D.; Irish, Joel D.; Malhi, Ripan S.; Orlando, Ludovic; Song, Yun S.; Nielsen, Rasmus; Meltzer, David J.; Willerslev, Eske (January 2018). "Terminal Pleistocene Alaskan genome reveals first founding population of Native Americans" (PDF). Nature. 553 (7687): 203–207. Bibcode:2018Natur.553..203M. doi:10.1038/nature25173. PMID 29323294. S2CID 4454580.
