= Siberian Letopises =

Book

The Siberian Letopises (Сибирские летописи in Russian) are the Russian letopises of the late 16th - 18th centuries on the history of Siberia. They include the Yesipov Letopis, Kungur Letopis, Remezov Letopis, Stroganov Letopis, and others. These letopises represent a valuable source on the early history of Russian Siberia. Some of the chronicles were compiled later, such as Записки к Сибирской истории служащие (Notes, Dedicated to the History of Siberia) and Новая Сибирская летопись (New Siberian Chronicle) by I. Cherepanov, Летопись г. Иркутска с 1652 г. до наших дней (Chronicle of the City of Irkutsk from 1652 to present day) by P. Pezhemsky, Краткая летопись Енисейского и Туруханского края Енисейской губернии (A Brief Letopis of the Yenisey and Turukhansk Krais of the Yenisey Guberniya) (1594–1893) by A. I. Kytmanov. Altogether, there are more than forty known Siberian Letopises.

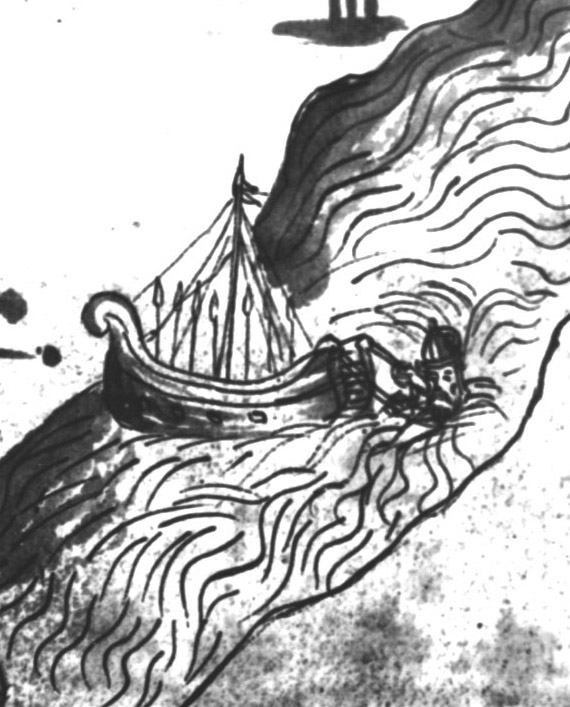
Yermak drowning in the Irtysh River, a miniature from the Remezov Letopis

The questions of origins and authenticity of the Siberian Letopises were dealt with in different ways by the Russian historiographers. The traditional scheme of development of the Siberian letopis-writing was proposed by Sergei Bakhrushin. He thought the companions of Yermak Timofeyevich to compile the so-called Написание, како приидоша в Сибирь (Notes on How We Came to Siberia) in 1621, which did not survive to the present day. Based on these notes, they compiled the so-called Синодик Тобольского собора in 1622, or Synodikon of the Tobolsk Cathedral (синодик, from the Greek word synodikón, which means a list of the dead submitted to church for remembrance in prayer). Savva Yesipov compiled his own letopis in 1636 based on the Notes and Synodikon. In mid-17th century, they compiled the Stroganov Letopis based on the Notes and archives of the Stroganovs, which has no immediate connection with the Yesipov Letopis. In the late 16th to the second half of the 17th century, they compiled the Kungur Letopis based on verbal narrations of Yermak's companions and folklore of the late 16th century. The Remezov Letopis was compiled in the late 17th century. Around that time, the so-called Описание Новые Земли Сибирского государства (Description of the New Lands of the Siberian State) was written by Nikifor Venyukov.
