= Stroganov Letopis =

17th-century Russian chronicle

The Stroganov Letopis (Russian: Строгановская летопись), also known under the name "On Capturing of the Siberian Land" (Russian: "О взятии Сибирской земли"), is a Russian chronicle and one of the earliest Siberian Letopises.

There is no unanimous opinion in the Russian scientific community with regards to the exact date of this chronicle compilation. It is generally considered that it was written either in 1620–1630 or 1668–1673. Some historians believe that parts of the Stroganov Letopis are based on the Yesipov Letopis, which was written in 1636. The Stroganov Letopis is based on annalistic data (which have not survived to this day) and materials of the Stroganovs' archives, including their correspondence with Yermak's druzhina. The Stroganov Letopis tells in great detail about the events of the early stage of the annexation of Siberia by Russia. The Stroganovs' initiative to organize Yermak's campaign is put in the forefront in this chronicle.
