= Remezov Letopis =

17th-century Russian chronicle

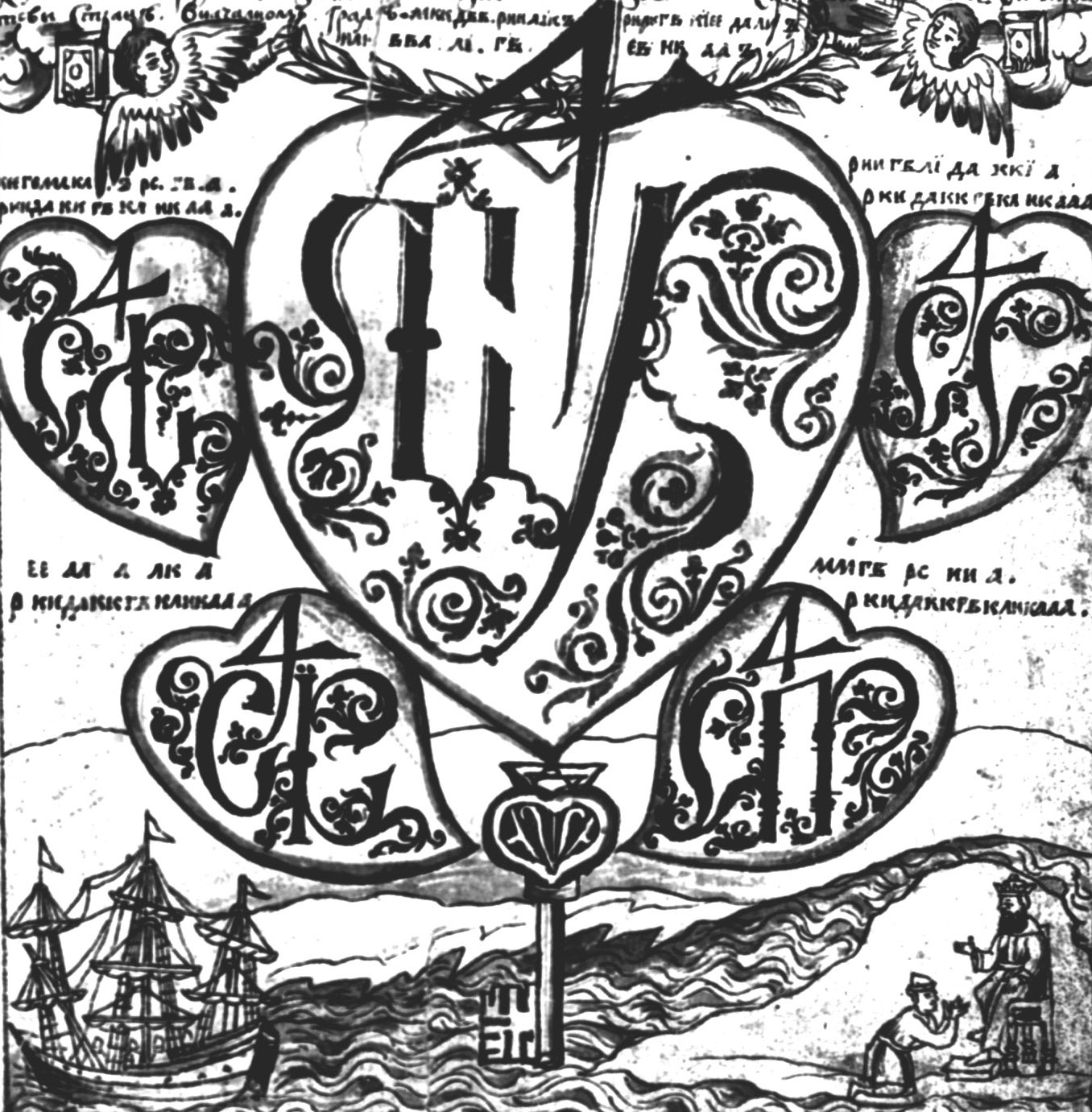
Page from the Remezov Letopis

The Remezov Letopis or Remezov Chronicle (Russian: Ремезовская летопись) is a Russian chronicle and one of the Siberian Letopises, compiled by Russian historian Semyon Remezov in the late 17th century. It includes the so-called Kungur Chronicle.

== Description ==
The Yesipov Letopis is the principal source. There are two versions; the Mirovich version was printed in the 1907 volume and belonged to Pyotr Mirovich, who helped Gerhard Friedrich Müller find the manuscript in Tobolsk. Müller handed it to the St. Petersburg Academy of Sciences in 1744 and called it the Tobolsk Chronicle. It was first published in Opisaniye Sibirskago tsarstva in 1750. The Mirovich version contains illustrations.

Although it is undated and appears to be unsigned, it is known to have been written by Semyon Remezov, the son of a Tobolsk noble. A letter code in the last paragraph says "written by Semyon Remezov" when solved.

== Sources ==
- Armstrong, Terence (15 May 2017). Yermak's Campaign in Siberia: A selection of documents translated from the Russian by Tatiana Minorsky and David Wileman. Routledge. ISBN 978-1-134-78941-2.
- Kivelson, Valerie Ann (2006). Cartographies of Tsardom: The Land and Its Meanings in Seventeenth-century Russia. Cornell University Press. ISBN 978-0-8014-7253-4.
