= History of Tyumen =

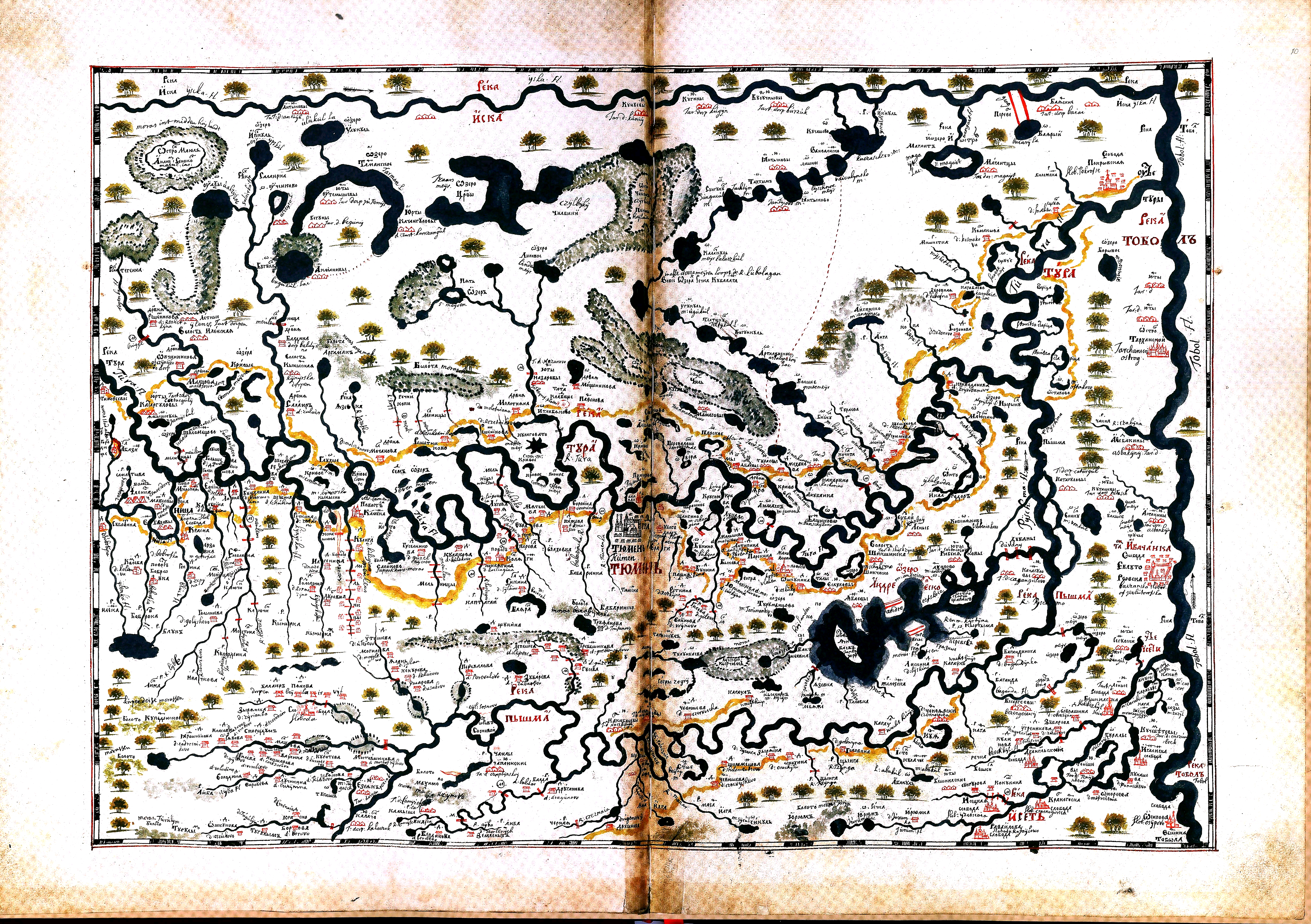
Map of Tyumen and its surroundings from the end of the 17th century, from the "Siberian Service Book" compiled by Semyon Remezov in 1701.

The history of Tyumen (the first Russian city in Siberia) began in the late 16th century, though the area has been inhabited since ancient times. Before the Russian settlement, the site was the location of Chingi-Tura, the capital of the Tyumen Khanate.

== Historiography ==
The history of Tyumen has been studied by numerous scholars. Early history was reflected in the works of the first professional historian of Siberia, Gerhard Friedrich Müller, in his "Description of the Siberian Kingdom" (1750).

In 1858, local historian N. A. Abramov published a historical sketch of the city up to the mid-19th century. Before the Russian Revolution, a significant contribution was made by P. M. Golovachev, who published the collection "Tyumen in the 17th Century" (1903).

Soviet scholars, including Sergey Bakhrushin and V. I. Shchunkov, researched the city's role in the development of Siberia. The establishment of Soviet power was studied by P. I. Roshchevsky. Further research by M. M. Gromyko, N. Kurilov, V. A. Skubnevsky, and G. Kh. Rabinovich focused on Tyumen as a commercial center. Architectural monuments were documented by V. I. Kochedamov, A. M. Pribytkova, and S. V. Kopylova.

In the post-Soviet period, a key contribution was made by V. M. Kruzhinov, whose works cover political and socio-economic processes from the city's foundation to the 21st century.

== Predecessors ==
The earliest traces of human presence in the territory of modern Tyumen are found on the shores of Andreevskoye Lake (Kozlovskaya and Koshkinskaya archaeological cultures of the Neolithic era) and on the left bank of the Tura River (Sargat culture of the early Iron Age).

From the 13th to the 16th centuries, the capital of the Tyumen Khanate, Chingi-Tura (also known as Chimgi-Tura), was located on the banks of the Tyumenka River. The name "Tyumen" was first mentioned in 1406 in the Arkhangelogorod Chronicle (Ustyug Chronicle Collection):

That same winter, Tsar Jenibek killed Tokhtamysh in the Siberian land near Tyumen, and he himself sat in the Horde.

On the map by Anton Wied (compiled between 1537 and 1544), the settlement is indicated as Tvmen Wilky (Tyumen the Great). In 1549, the Austrian diplomat Sigismund von Herberstein also mentioned the fortress in his book Notes on Muscovite Affairs. By the time of the Russian conquest of Siberia, Chingi-Tura had lost its former influence, and on August 1, 1581, it was taken by storm by the Cossacks.

== Tyumen Fortress ==
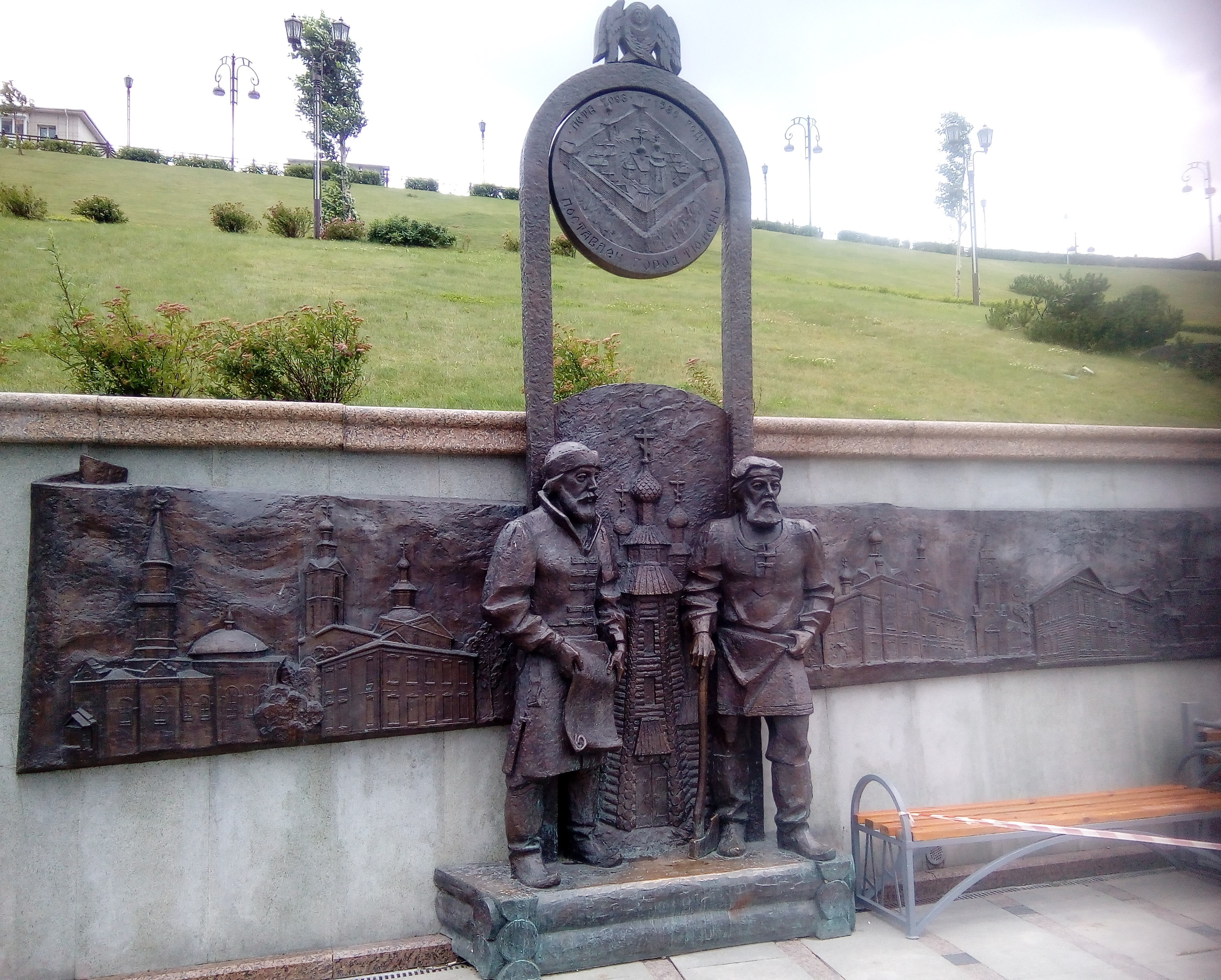
Statue of the founders: voyevodas Ivan Myasnoy and Vasily Sukin

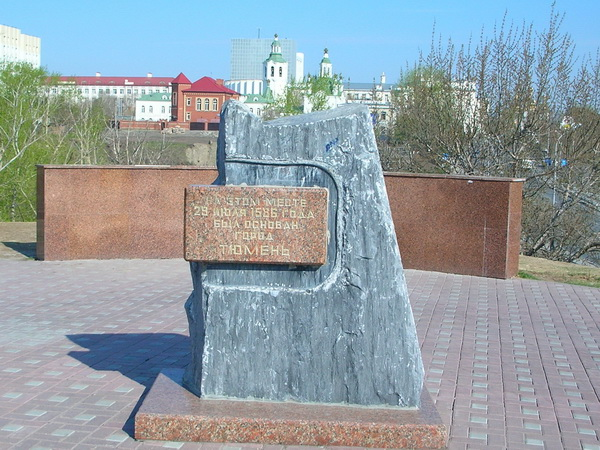
Memorial stone at the site of the city's foundation

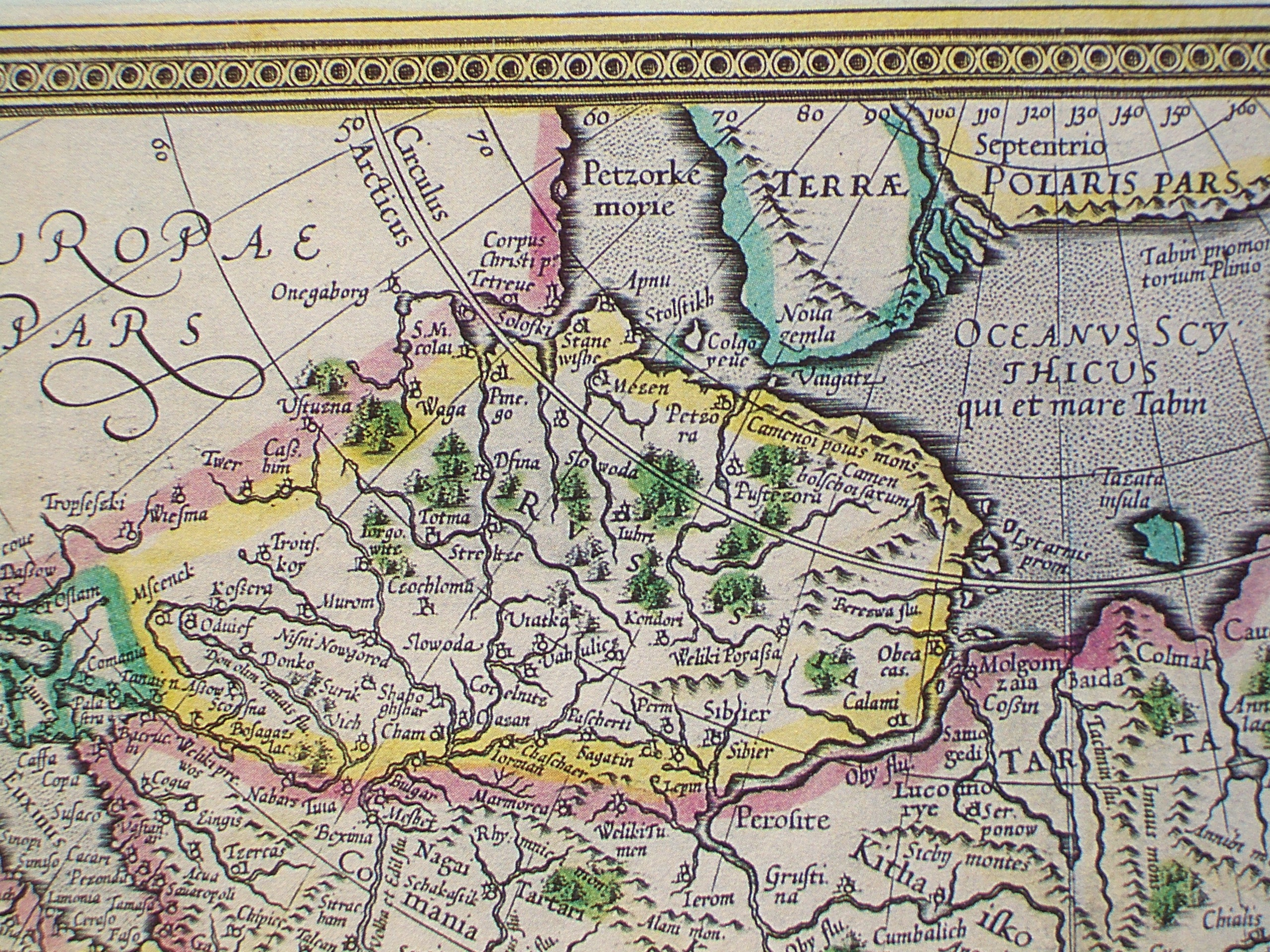
Tyumen (Weliki Tumen) in Mercator's Atlas (1595)

Russian Tyumen was first mentioned around February 1586 in an order regarding the meeting of the Polish ambassador M. B. Garaburda:

And [the Tsar] ordered the construction of cities in the Siberian land... on the Tyumen settlement and on the Ob at the mouth of the Irtysh... and they sit in those cities and tribute is collected from all those lands for the Sovereign.

The construction of the Tyumen ostrog (fortress) began on July 29 (August 8), 1586, near Chingi-Tura, by decree of Tsar Fyodor Ivanovich. The founding was also attended by Maitmas Achekmatov, the head of the Tyumen service Tatars:

He built... with Russian service people three cities — Tobolsk, Tyumen, Tara...

Initially, the city was settled by migrants from Perm, Solvychegodsk, and Veliky Ustyug. According to the 1624 census, more than half of the households belonged to service class people (sluzhilye lyudi). In 1618, the Holy Trinity Monastery was founded. Between 1640 and 1642, the central part of the city was reinforced with walls.
