= Vladimir Rayevsky (poet) =

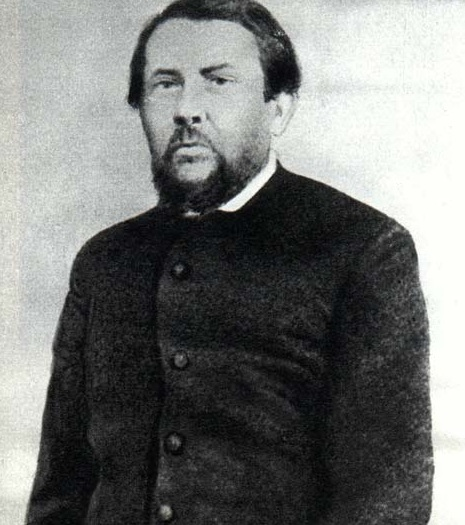
Vladimir Rayevsky

Vladimir Fedoseyevich Rayevsky (Russian: Владимир Федосеевич Раевский; 8 April [O.S. 28 March] 1795 – 20 July [O.S. 8 July] 1872) was a Russian poet, who participated in the Patriotic war of 1812.

After the war, when living in Tiraspol, he became a leading member of the Southern Society of Decembrists. The world's only known statue of him is located in Tiraspol.
