= Yesipov Letopis =

17th-century Russian chronicle

The Yesipov Letopis or Yesipov Chronicle (Russian: Есиповская летопись) is a Russian chronicle and one of the Siberian Letopises, dedicated to the memory of Yermak. It was compiled in 1636 by Savva Yesipov, a podyachy of the Siberian archbishop Nectarius.
