= Semyon Remezov =

Russian historian and geographer (c. 1642 – after 1720)

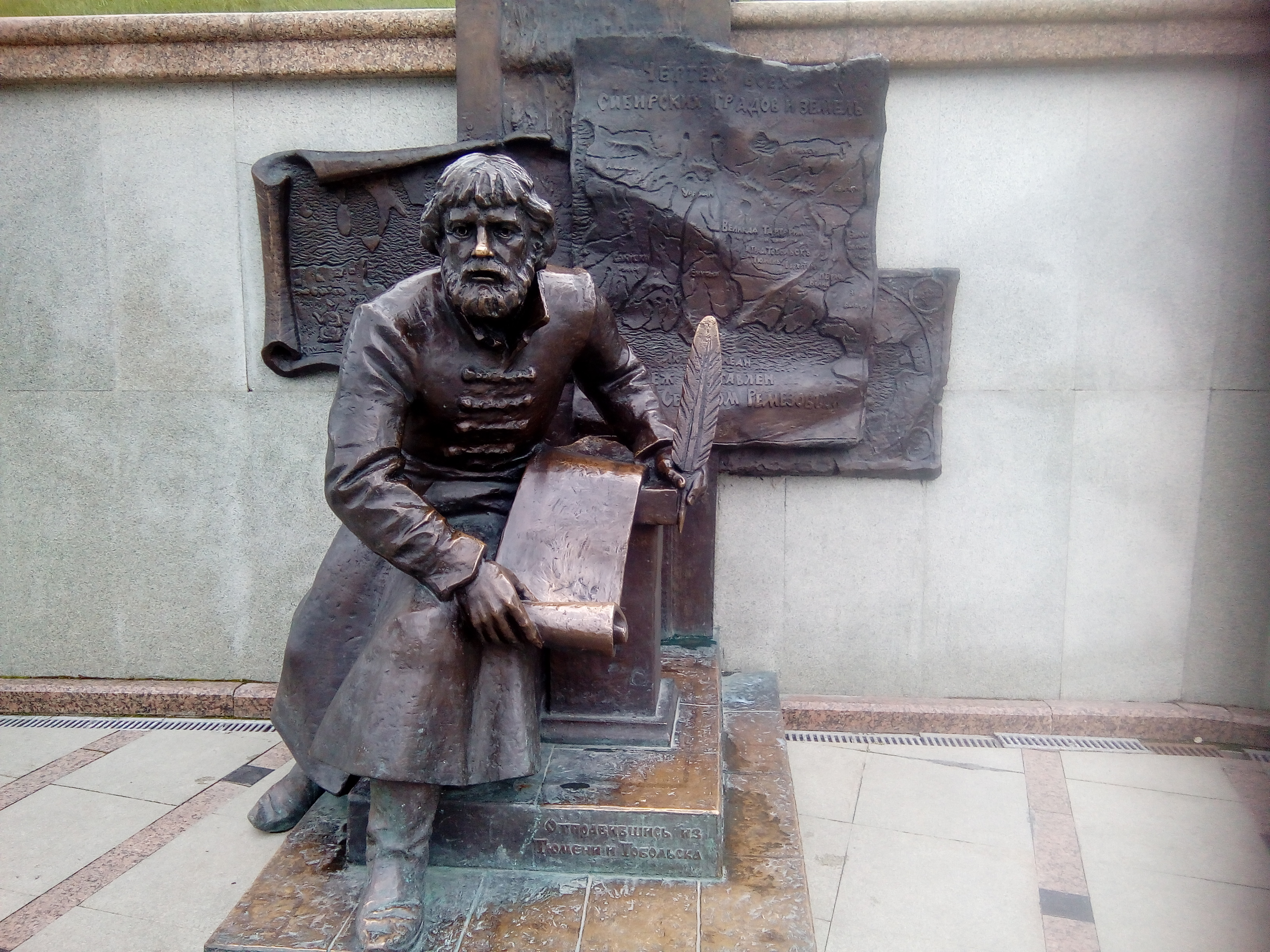
Statue of Semyon Remezov on the Tura embankment, Tyumen, Russia

Semyon Ulyanovich Remezov (Russian: Семён Улья́нович Ре́мезов; c. 1642, Tobolsk – after 1720, Tobolsk) was a Russian historian, architect, and geographer of Siberia. He is responsible for compiling three collections of maps, charts, and drawings of Siberia, which effectively became atlases of the area. Remezov's atlases were important for Peter the Great's imperial expansion into the eastern territory of Russia as they provided him with information about the Siberian landscape and the location of its indigenous communities. Such knowledge became necessary for future administrative and military projects in the area.

Remezov's cartography of Siberia blends traditional Russian map-making practices with those of modern science and the Enlightenment that were beginning to influence Russian culture at this time. For instance, Remezov's maps followed the Russian pattern of using river systems as a basis for design, instead of astronomical points. This resulted in many of his maps being oriented to the south instead of the north. Yet he “wrote excessively in praise of the compass” and used universally accepted scales and measures in his atlases. Remezov's maps contain valuable information for better understanding the environmental history of Siberia and Eurasia.

Remezov's cartography also shows the spread of Christianity across Siberia. In his maps, newly founded cities are represented by elaborate churches, and, as Remezov boasts in his writing, the Russians brought the “light of inexpressible joy” to Siberia. To Remezov, the Tsar's imperial conquest had a religious and missionary component as well, where land gained for Russia was likewise gained for God and his Church. At the same time, as Erika Monahan has shown, close reading of Remezov's first atlas reveals how the actual reach of the "tsar's mighty hand" did not necessarily match the state's imperial claims in the early modern period.

Remezov's lively and extensive body of work make him the preeminent, if not exclusive, source for Russian cartography in the late 17th and early 18th centuries. His first atlas may contain the first Russian-drawn panorama of a Siberian town. The whereabouts of the first atlas, often referred to as the Chorography were unknown for over a century. Contrary to conventional wisdom, Erika Monahan has argued that G. F. Mueller, who had unparalleled knowledge of Siberian cartography to date and even purchased a copy of Remezov's Illustrated Chronicle when he was in Siberia, was unaware of Remezov's atlases.

== Sources ==
- "Ремезов, Семен Ульянович" . Brockhaus and Efron Encyclopedic Dictionary (in Russian). 1906.
- V. K. Ziborov. Семен Ульянович Ремезов [Semyon Ulyanovich Remezov], in Словарь книжников и книжности древней Руси [Dictionary of Book People and Book Culture of Old Russia]. Vol. 3 (17th century), Part 3 (letters P through S). Saint Petersburg, Dmitry Bulanin Publishers, 1988. pp. 195–196.
