= Sausage Stroganoff =

Sausage Stroganoff may refer to:

- Any variety of beef Stroganoff made with sausages instead of beef.
- Korv stroganoff - a Swedish dish based on beef Stroganoff, which traditionally uses Falukorv sausage as a substitute for the beef.
