= Madonna and Child (studio of Perugino) =

Painting by the studio of Perugino

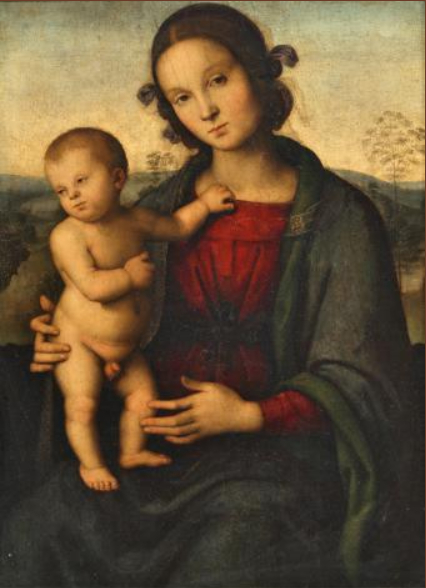
Madonna and Child (c. 1500–1510) by the studio of Perugino

Madonna and Child is an oil on canvas painting by the studio of Perugino, created c. 1500–1510. In the collection of the Stroganovs it was thought to be an autograph work. Variants survive in the Galleria Borghese and the Fitzwilliam Museum.

It was seized by the Soviet state during the October Revolution and in 1922 assigned to the Hermitage Museum, before being moved to its present home in the Pushkin Museum in Moscow.
