= Pavel Sergeyevich Stroganov =

Russian art collector (1823–1911)

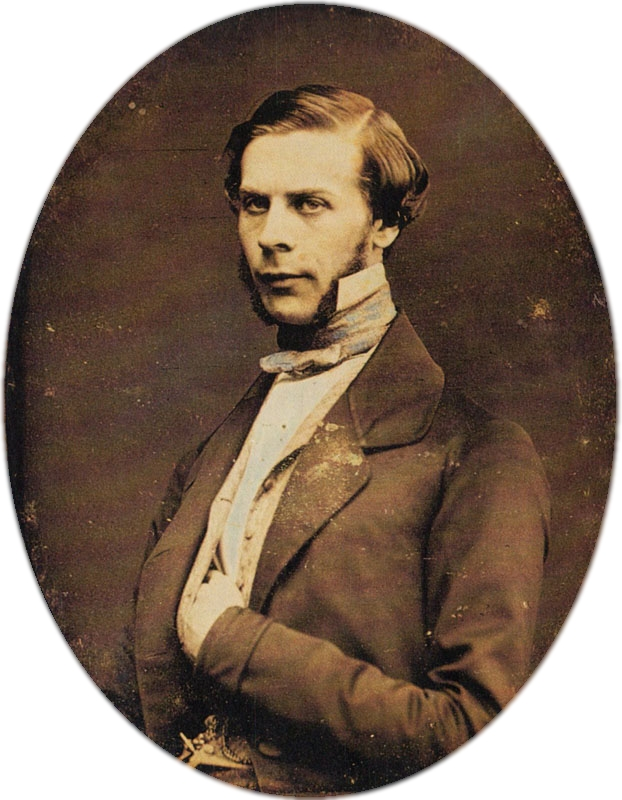
Pavel Sergeyevich Stroganov (1850s)

Count Pavel Sergeyevich Stroganov (Russian: Па́вел Серге́евич Стро́ганов; 13 April 1823 – 17 December 1911) was an art collector, philanthropist, and cup-bearer at the Imperial Court.

== Early life ==
Stroganov was born on 13 April 1823 in Saint Petersburg. He was the second son among the four sons and three daughters of Count Sergei Grigoryevich Stroganov and Countess Natalia Pavlovna Stroganova (1796-1872), who were cousins whose marriage had united two separate lines of the Stroganov family (his father was descended from Nikolai Grigoryevich Stroganov, the second son of Grigory Dmitriyevich Stroganov and his mother was descended from Sergei Grigoryevich Stroganov, the third son of Nikolai Grigoryevich Stroganov).

His paternal grandparents were Baron Grigory Stroganov and Princess Anna Trubetskaya. His maternal grandparents were Count Pavel Alexandrovich Stroganov and Princess Sophie Golitsyna (a daughter of Prince Vladimir Borisovich Golitsyn and his wife Nathalia Petrovna).

== Career ==
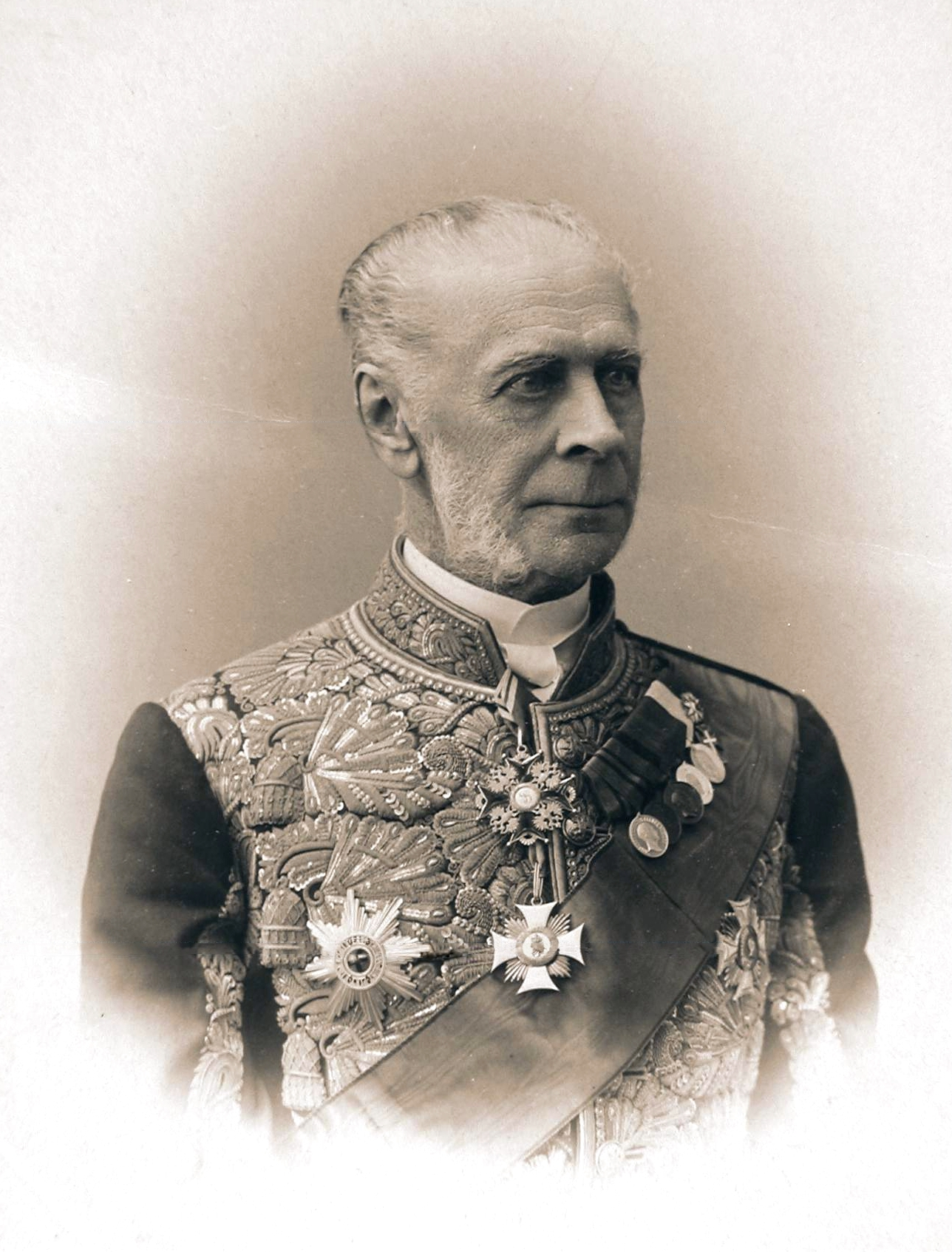
Stroganov in the early 1900s

He graduated from the law faculty of Moscow State University in 1845, after which he entered the Ministry of Foreign Affairs and was posted to the embassy in Rome, as Third Secretary, in 1847. Two years later, he was named a Titular Counselor at the ministry and, in 1852, he was appointed Junior Secretary at the embassy in Vienna. In 1855, at his request, he was returned to Rome. The following year, he was awarded the Order of Saint Stanislaus.

After 1888, he served as a Privy Councilor and Hofmeister. In 1894, he was honored with the position of "обер-шенки" (cup-bearer). By this time, his collection had grown so large he found it necessary to store some of the less important works at his estate in Tambov Province.

== Personal life ==
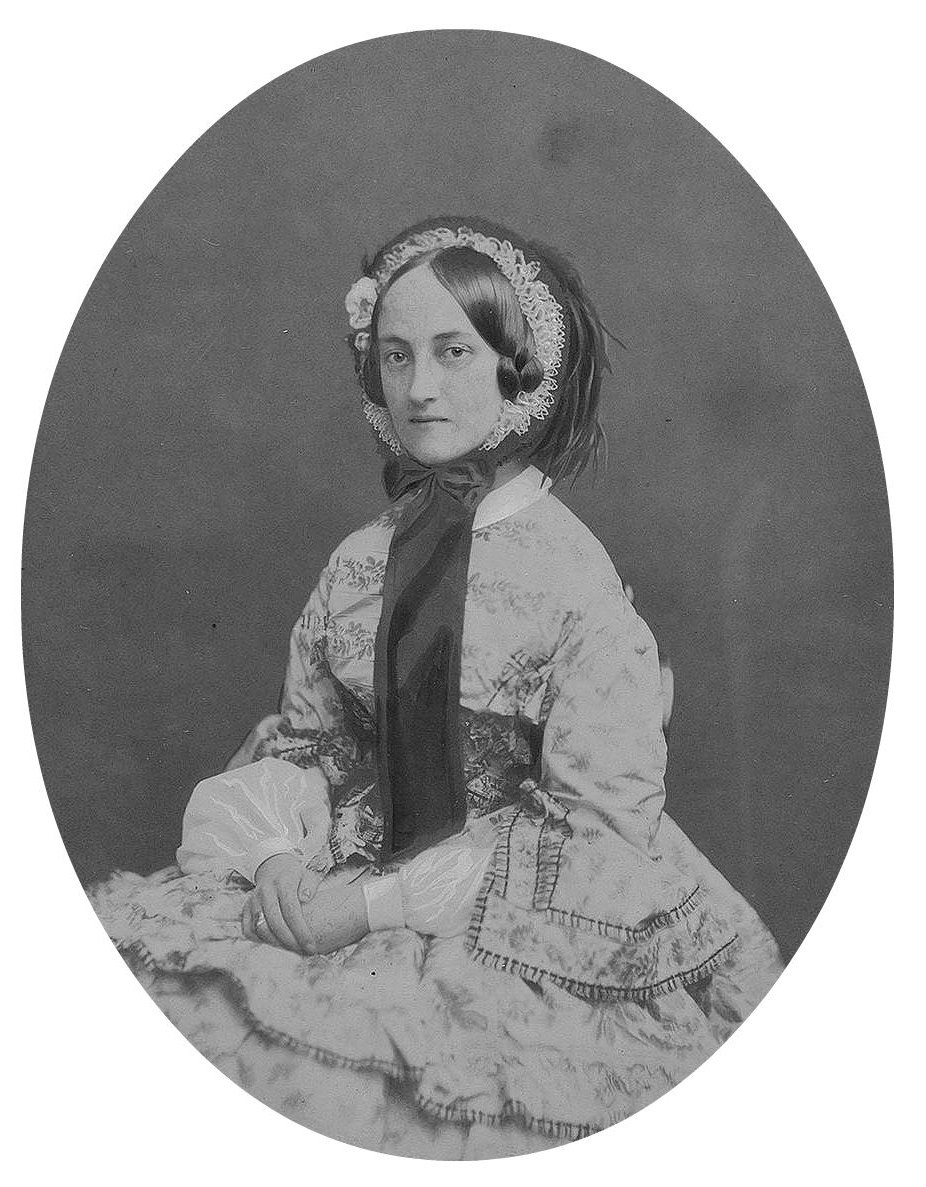
His wife, Anna; photograph by Sergey Levitsky (1856/58)

In 1851, he married Anna Dmitrievna Buturlina (1825-1906), daughter of the General and Senator, Dmitry Buturlin. She was a founder, and served as a trustee, of the orphanage at the Sergiev Orthodox Brotherhood, for which she was awarded the Order of Saint Catherine in 1891. They had no children.

He died at home in Saint Petersburg, aged eighty-eight, of "heart paralysis" and was interred at the Trinity Lavra of St. Sergius, next to Anna, who had died of a cerebral haemorrhage . The most valuable works from his collection were bequeathed to the Hermitage Museum.

=== Art collection ===
During his services abroad, he became interested in collecting paintings. Having inherited a house from his grandfather, he began remodeling it to suit his collection; hiring the Court Architect, Ippolit Monighetti, to carry out the work. He effectively turned his home into a museum, featuring early Italian painting and a collection of Chinese prints. In 1861, he organized and exhibition of works from several private collections, as well as the Imperial Collection, at the Imperial Academy of Arts.

His home and collection were described in detail by the novelist, Dmitry Grigorovich, in a special edition of Пчела (The Bee), an arts and literature magazine. As a result, Stroganov used his influence to get Grigorovich an appointment as Secretary at the Imperial Society for the Encouragement of the Arts. He also made a donation to the Society to establish two awards: one for landscape painting, named after his father, and one for sculpture, named after himself. Later, he would donate items from his collection to the Society's museum.
