= Stroganov school =

Major Russian icon-painting school

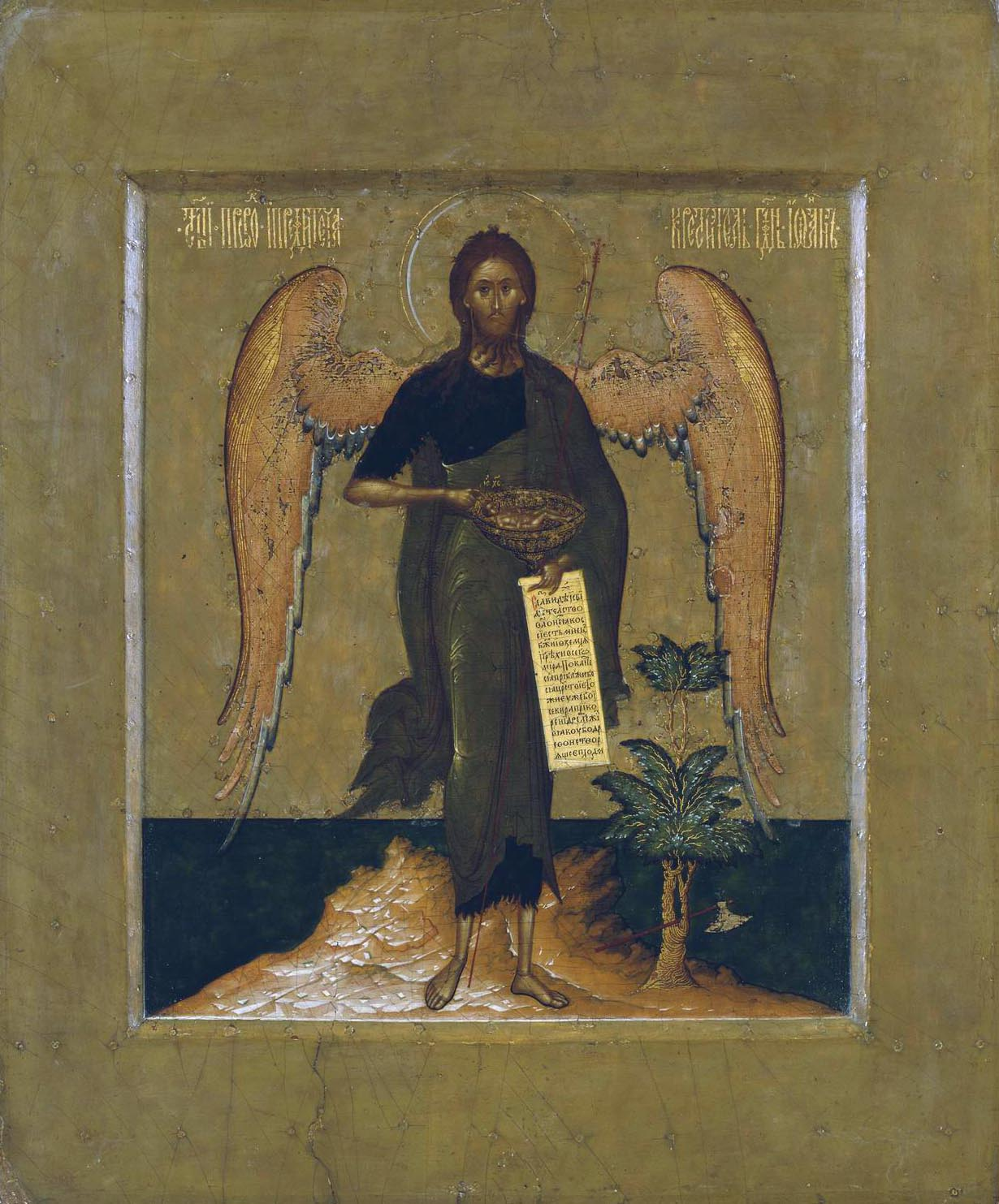
The Stroganov icons are characterized by unusually fine, meticulous brushwork and mild, sandy colours. Icon Desert Angel John the Forerunner (Иоанн Предтеча ангел пустыни) by Prokopy Chirin as displayed at the Tretyakov Gallery.

The Stroganov school (Russian: Строгановская школа) is a conventional name for the last major Russian icon-painting school, which thrived under the patronage of the rich Stroganov family of merchants in the late 16th and 17th centuries.

The Stroganov school owes its name to frequent mentioning of the Stroganovs on the markings on the back of the icons of Yemelyan Moskvitin, Stefan Pakhirya, Prokopy Chirin, Istoma, Nazariy, and Nikifor Saviny. Most of these icon painters, however, did not belong to the Stroganov school. They were icon painters from Moscow and executed commissions by the tsar. Many of their works were eventually acquired by the Stroganovs, who had been known as connoisseurs of sophisticated craftsmanship.

The works of art of the Stroganov school have quite a few features in common, such as small size, exquisite diminutiveness, refined palette (mostly achieved with half-tints, golden, and silver colours), the density of paint layers, graphic precision of details, the fragile and somewhat pretentious delicacy of characters' postures and gestures, the richness of their vestments, and complicated fantasy of landscape background.
