= Anikey Stroganov =

Russian explorer, merchant and monk (1488–1570)

- Аникей Строганов
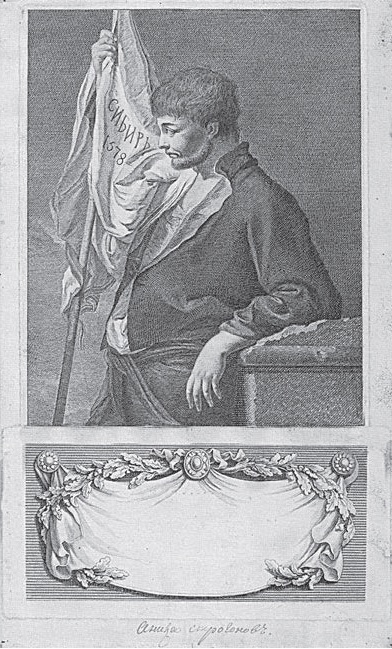
- 1780 reengraving by A. Tsukki of a 16th-century engraving
- Born: Anikey Fyodorovich Stroganov; 1488; Novgorod, Russia
- Died: 1570; Solvychegodsk, Russia
- Known for: progenitor of the Stroganov family
- Children: 15, including Semyon
- Parent: Fyodor Lukich Stroganov (father)

Anikey Fyodorovich Stroganov (also spelled Anika or Aniky; Russian: Аникей Фёдорович Строганов; Christian name: Joasaphus (Иоасаф); 1488–1570) was a Russian explorer, merchant and monk. He was an early progenitor of the Stroganov family, whose members were prominent Russian merchants, industrialists, landowners, noblemen, and statesmen through to the early 20th century.

== Biography ==
Anikey Stroganov was the youngest of the four sons of Fyodor Lukich Stroganov. He was born in Novgorod, but soon after his birth, the Stroganovs migrated to Solvychegodsk. After the deaths of his brothers Stefan, Iosif and Vladimir, his father became a monk. All the family wealth, included several large estates and saltworks, were passed to Anikey.

Anikey improved and expanded his salt business and when his sons Yakov, Grigory and Semyon became adults, Anikey founded new salterns in the Kolskaya Guba and Perm.

In the beginning of the reign of Tsar Ivan the Terrible, Stroganov received the right to control the trade rules prescribed for English merchants, traveling from Arkhangelsk to Moscow. These rights were confirmed in documents signed in 1552, 1555 and 1560. Stroganov performed also other duties for the tsar, like collecting taxes from the obrok in Solvychegodsk.

Stroganov established trade routes with the indigenous tribes of Siberia. On 4 April 1558, Ivan the Terrible granted Grigory and his successors large estates along the Kama and Chusovaya rivers, including tax income and other privileges for 20 years. Stroganov organized migration there and founded several settlements.

On 16 August 1566, Anikey Stroganov received a new privilege; at his own request their lands were included in the oprichnina. Seizing lands from the local population by conquest and colonizing them with incoming Russian peasants, the Stroganovs developed farming, hunting, saltworks, fishing, and ore mining in these areas. They built towns and fortresses and, at the same time, suppressed local unrest with the help of their druzhinas and annexed new lands in the Urals and Siberia in favor of Russia.

Anikey Stroganov was married two times. His first wife, Mavra, died in 1544. After the death of the second wife in 1567, Stroganov moved in with his youngest son Semyon. He had three children with his first wife and twelve with his second wife. Like his father, Anikey soon became a monk, going by the name Joasaphus (Иоасаф). He died in 1570 at the age of 80 years and 10 months.

== Bibliography ==
- Kruptsov, V. I. (2003). Род Строгановых. Chelyabinsk: Каменный пояс. ISBN 5-88771-031-4.
