= Semyon Stroganov =

16th century Russian businessman

Semyon Stroganov (Russian: Семён Аникеевич Строганов) (died 22 October 1586) was a Russian merchant from the family of Stroganov who financed Yermak's Siberian campaign in 1581.

Semyon was the younger son of Anikey Stroganov. His date of birth is unknown, but most likely he reached adulthood before 1559. In this year Anikey and his elder sons Yakov and Grigori moved from Solvychegodsk to his newly granted lands in the Perm Krai. Semyon stayed in Solvychegodsk, where he successfully led the family business there by himself. In 1567 Anikey Stroganov decided to withdraw from business, and rejoined Semyon in Solvychegodsk, where he lived for a short time before becoming a monk.

After the death of his father in 1570 - 1571, Semyon began a quarrel with his brothers. The reasons for this quarrel are unknown. On 29 June 1573 tsar Ivan the Terrible issued an ukaz proclaiming Semyon guilty "for robbery". The aftermath of quarrel is also not certain, but only his brothers received lands in Siberia after this. However, after the deaths of Yakov and Grigori he took part in the division of the family wealth and received an appropriate part.

The information about his participation in the preparation of the Yermak expedition is contradictory. In the tsar's ukase of 16 November 1583, only his nephews Maksim Yakovlevich and Nikita Grigoriyevich are mentioned. But in the Stroganov Chronicle Semyon Stroganov appeared as the sole supporter of Yermak. It is definitely known that he contributed three cannons to Yermak's expedition. After the results of the Yermak expedition became known, the Tsar granted new lands in Bolshaya and Malaya Sol to Semyon.

Semyon Stroganov was married two times and had two sons, Andrei and Pyotr.
