= Beef Stroganoff =

Russian sautéed beef dish with sauce

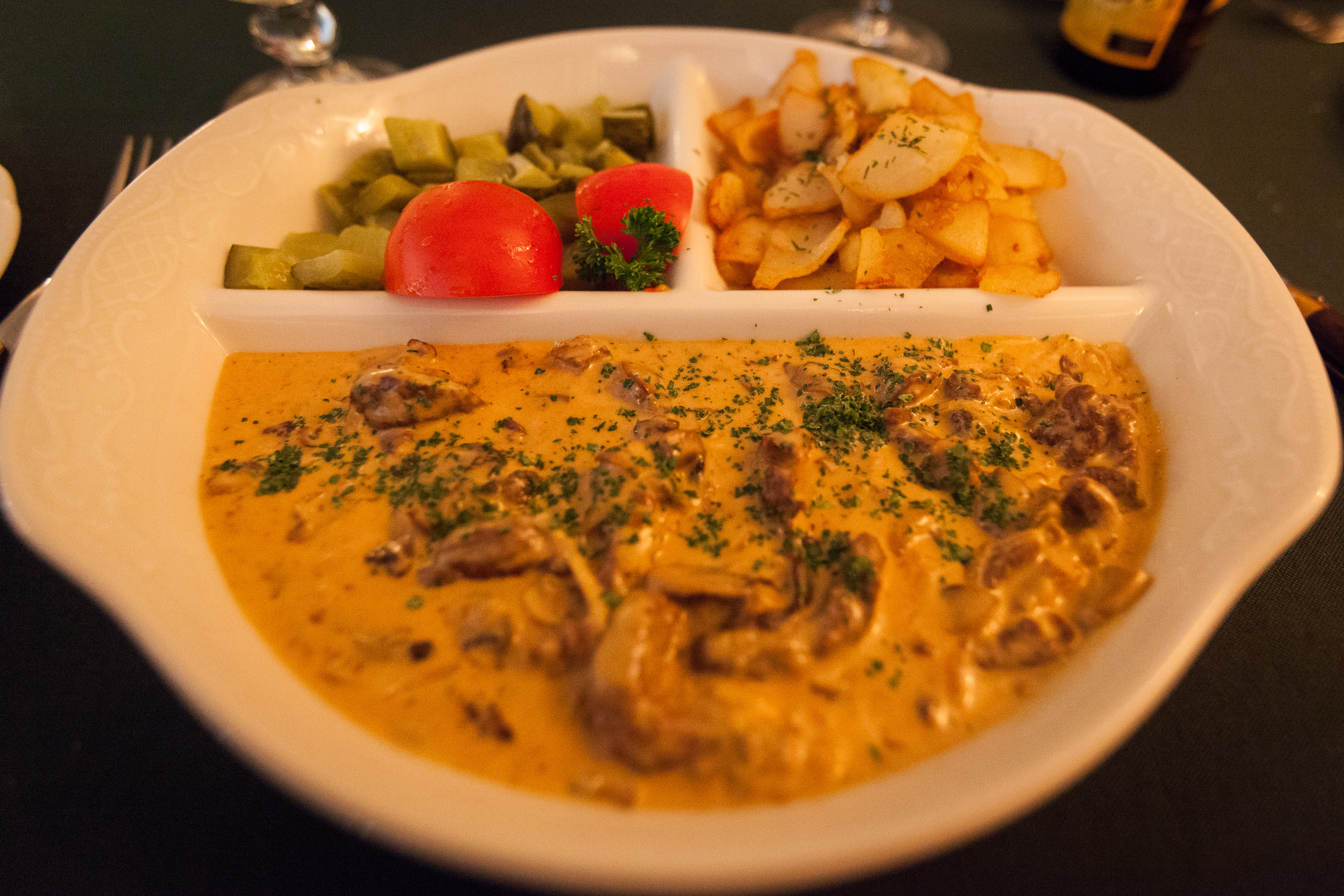
- A plate of beef Stroganoff with fried potato and pickled vegetables
- Course: Main
- Place of origin: Russia
- Serving temperature: Hot
- Main ingredients: Beef, smetana (sour cream)
- Variations: Chicken Stroganoff, sausage Stroganoff, mushroom Stroganoff, shrimp Stroganoff, veal Stroganoff, pork Stroganoff

Beef Stroganoff, also spelled beef Stroganov, (Note: UK: /ˈstrɒɡənɒf/, US: /ˈstrɔːɡənɔːf, ˈstroʊɡ-/; Russian: бефстроганов, romanized: befstroganov, IPA: [bʲɪfˈstroɡənəf]) is a Russian dish of sautéed pieces of beef in a sauce of mustard and smetana (heavy sour cream). It is named after one of the members of the Stroganov family. Since its appearance in the 19th century, it has become popular around the world, with considerable variation from the original recipe. Mushrooms are common in many variants.

== History ==
The dish is named after one of the members of the Stroganov family, a Russian noble family. It has been debated whether it is named after the diplomat Pavel Stroganov or the politician Alexander Stroganov. According to legend, while stationed in Siberia, Pavel Stroganov's chef found the beef to be frozen so solid that it could only be cut into small strips.

Another legend attributes its invention to French cooks working for the family, but several researchers point out that the recipe is a refined version of older Russian dishes. In Russian, the dish is called Бефстро́ганов, from the French bœuf Stroganoff.

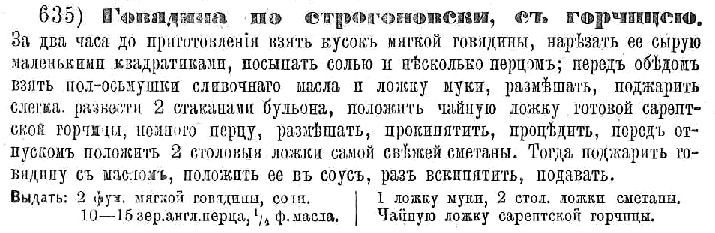
Recipe from A Gift to Young Housewives (1887 edition)

Elena Molokhovets's classic Russian cookbook A Gift to Young Housewives gives the first known recipe for Govjadina po-strogonovski, s gorchitseju, "Beef à la Stroganov, with mustard", in its 1871 edition. The recipe involves beef cubes (not strips) prepared in a dry marinade of salt and allspice, and then sautéed in butter. The sauce is a simple roux mixed with prepared mustard and broth, and finished with a small amount of sour cream: no onions, no mushrooms and no alcohol.

In 1891, the French chef Charles Brière, who was working in Saint Petersburg, submitted a recipe for beef Stroganoff to a competition sponsored by the French magazine L'Art culinaire. This led Larousse Gastronomique to assume that he was the inventor of this dish, but both the recipe and the name existed before then.

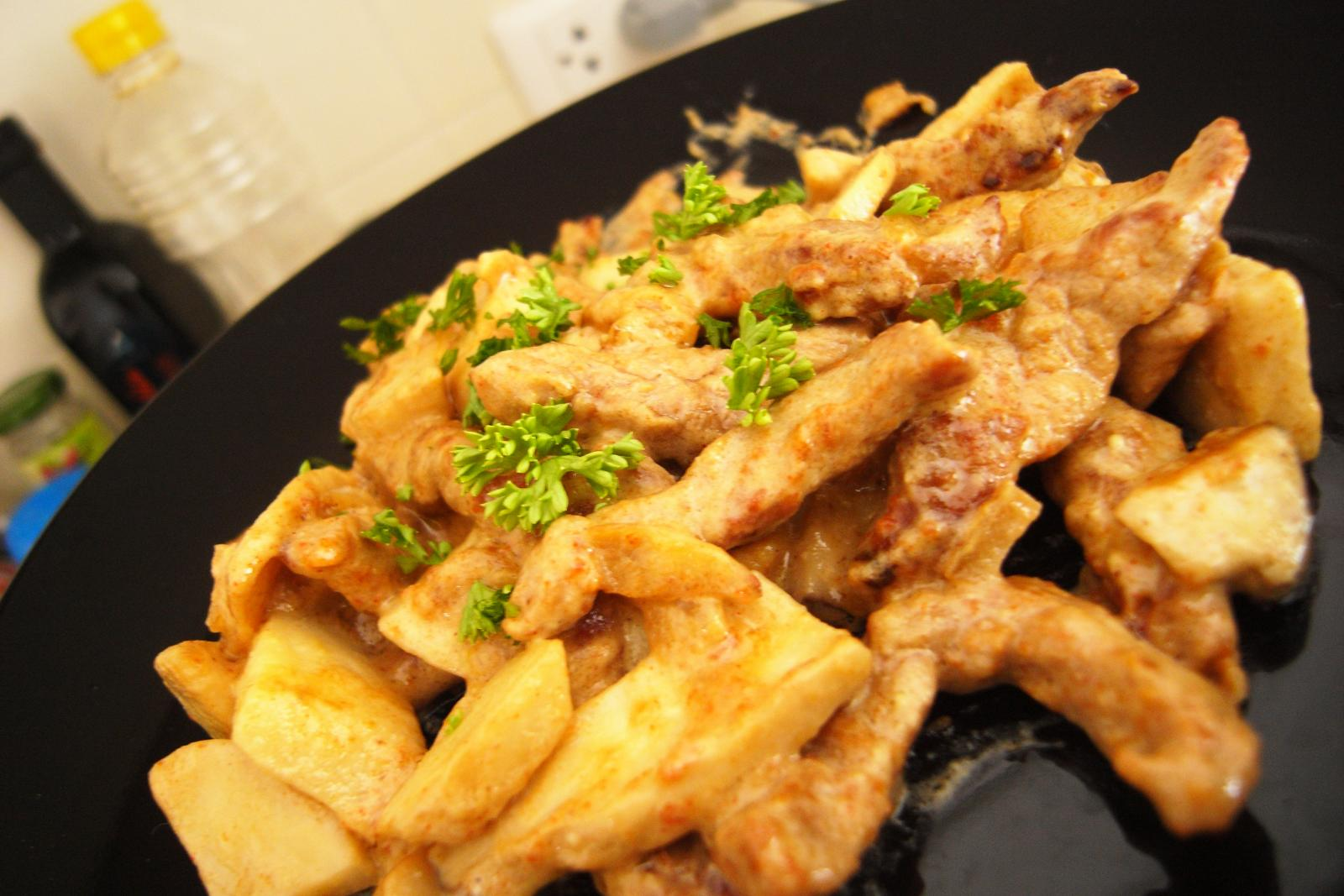
Sautéing of beef Stroganoff

A recipe from 1909 adds onions and tomato sauce, and serves it with crisp potato straws, which are considered the traditional side dish for beef Stroganoff in Russia. The version given in the 1938 Larousse Gastronomique includes beef strips, and onions, with either mustard or tomato paste optional.

After the fall of the Russian monarchy in 1917, the recipe was served in the hotels and restaurants of China before the start of World War II. The first English cookbook to include a recipe for beef Stroganoff is Ambrose Heath's Good Food (1932). The dish came to Hong Kong in the late 1950s.

In 1960s United States, several manufacturers introduced dehydrated beef stroganoff mixes, which were mixed with cooked beef and sour cream. It was also available freeze-dried for campers.

== Around the world ==
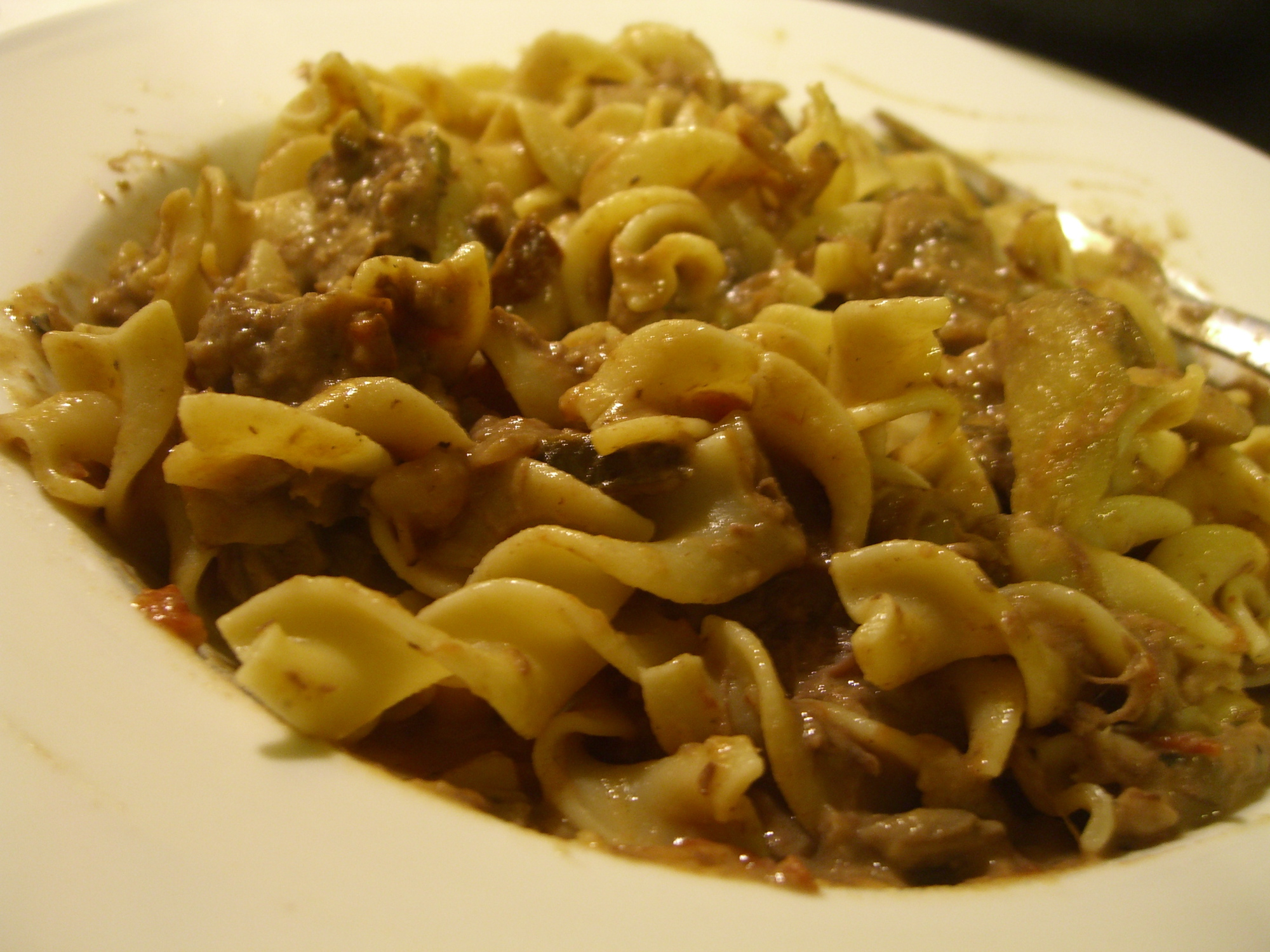
Beef Stroganoff with pasta

Beef Stroganoff preparation varies based on geography and factors such as the cut of meat and seasonings. The meat may be diced, cubed, or cut into strips. Some variations include mushrooms and onions or other vegetables and seasonings such as sugar, salt, black pepper, and bottled marinades (especially Worcestershire sauce) and rubs.

=== Brazil ===
Stroganoff is a popular dish in Brazil, where it is known as estrogonofe or strogonoff. Estrogonofe is generally prepared with tomato paste or ketchup and mushrooms. Chicken is sometimes used instead of beef. Estrogonofe is generally eaten with cooked white rice and shoestring fries (batata palha).

=== France ===
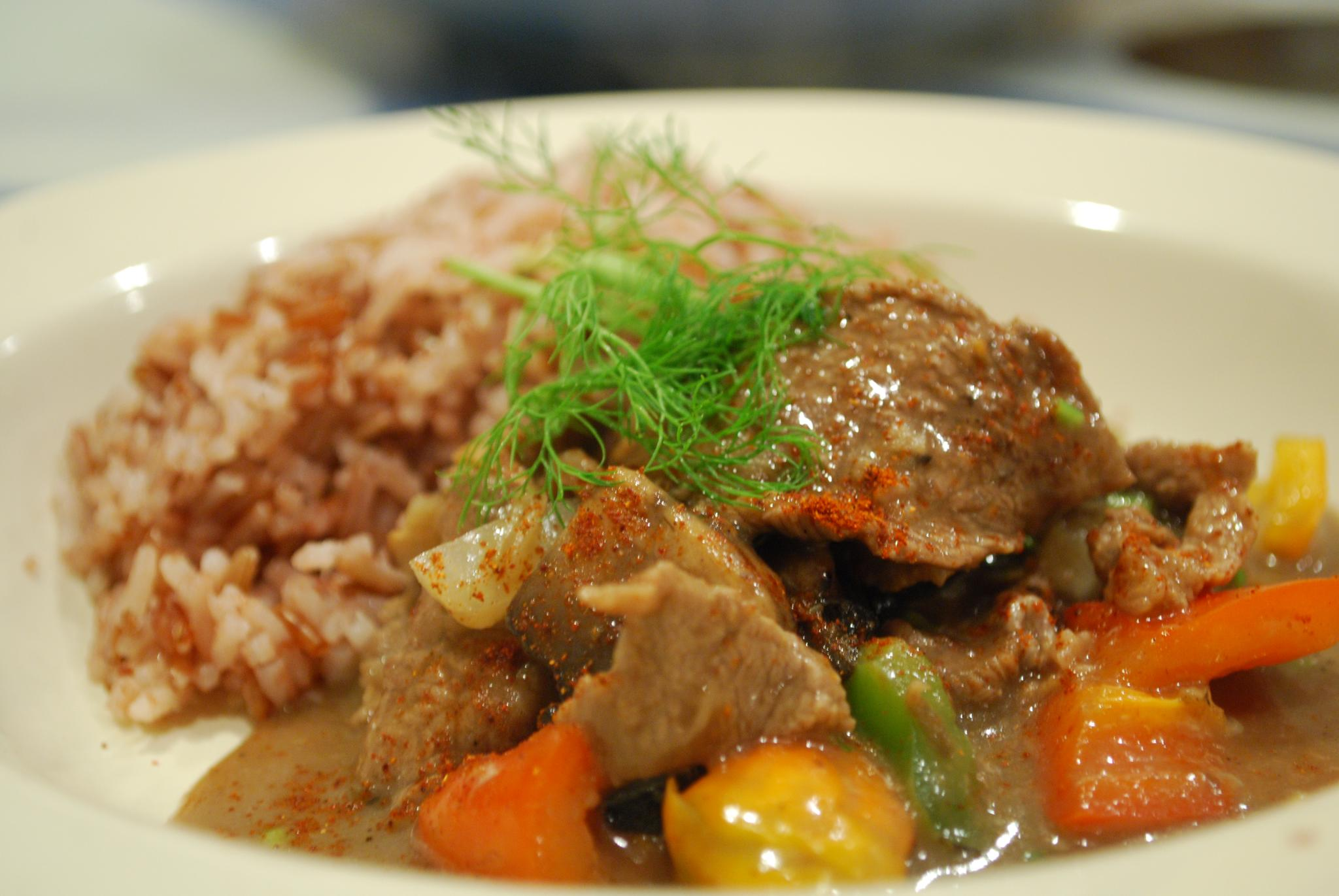
Beef Stroganoff cooked with paprika and served with rice

The French encyclopedia of gastronomy Larousse Gastronomique lists Stroganoff as a cream, paprika, veal stock and white wine recipe.

=== Japan ===
Stroganoff's popularity extends to Japan, where it is most commonly served with white rice, or white rice seasoned with parsley and butter. Its popularity increased dramatically with the introduction of "instant sauce cubes" from S&B Foods. These are cubes with dried seasoning and thickening agents that can be added to water, onion, beef, and mushrooms to make a Stroganoff-style sauce. Additionally, Japanese home recipes for Stroganoff frequently call for ingredients that are outside of Russian tradition, such as soy sauce.

=== Nordic countries ===
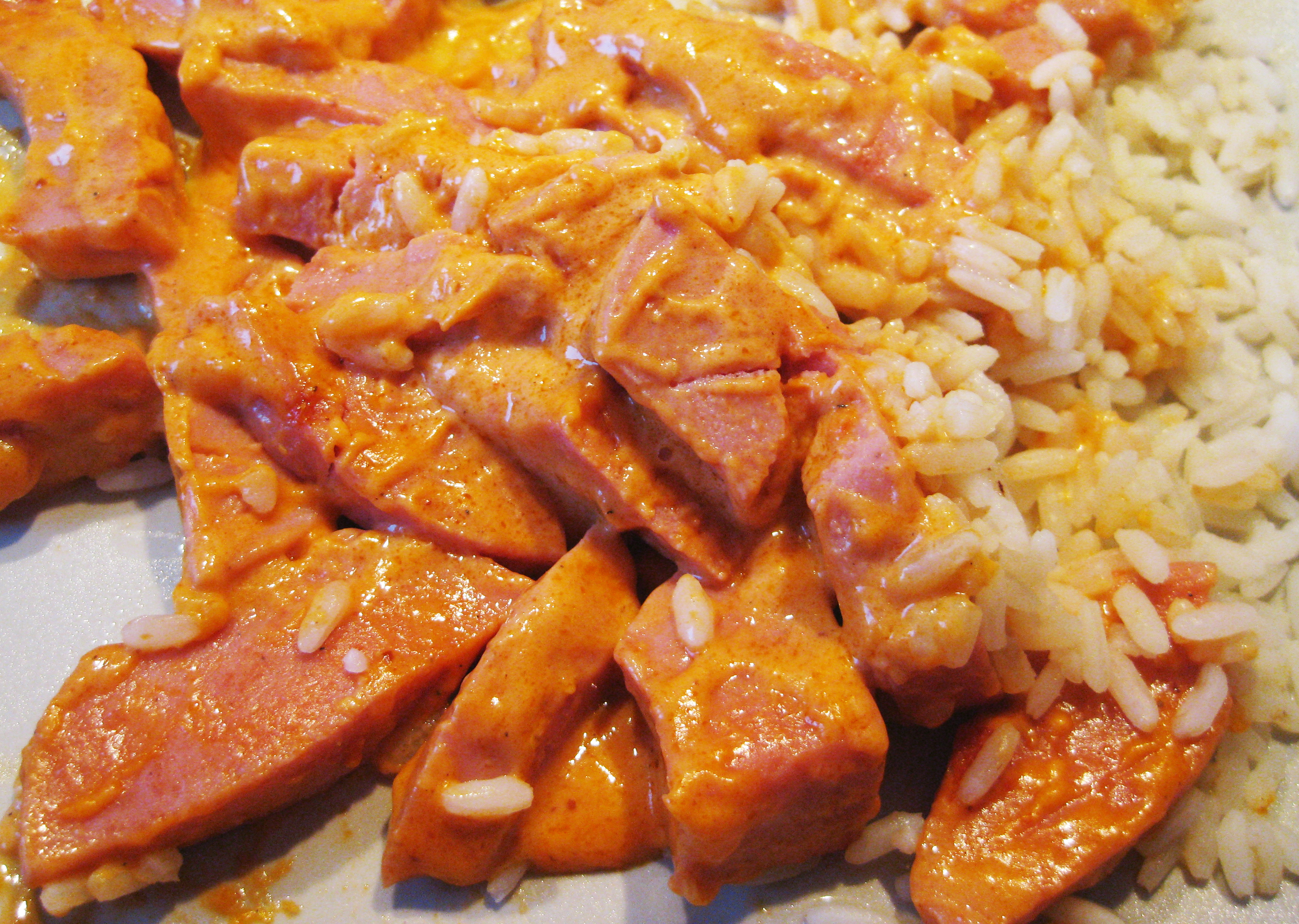
Swedish Korv Stroganoff with Falukorv, served with rice.

Stroganoff is also popular in Nordic countries. In Sweden, a common variant is Korv stroganoff (lit. 'sausage stroganoff'), which traditionally uses the local falukorv sausage as a substitute for the beef.

In Finland, the dish is called makkarastroganoff (lit. 'sausage stroganoff'). Diced brined pickles are sometimes added.

=== United Kingdom ===
Beef Stroganoff began appearing in British cookery books in the early 1930s and became widely popular by the 1970s, particularly in restaurants and at dinner parties. The dish later declined in popularity and became associated with mass-produced ready meals and buffet-style catering.

Modern British adaptations often include a creamy sauce made with white wine or brandy, sour cream or crème fraîche, and additions such as smoked paprika and English mustard. While beef fillet was traditionally used, contemporary recipes frequently use alternative proteins such as pork, chicken or sausages.

The dish is commonly served with rice, tagliatelle, or potatoes. In recent years, it has experienced limited revival in British food media, pub cuisine, and home cooking.

=== United States ===
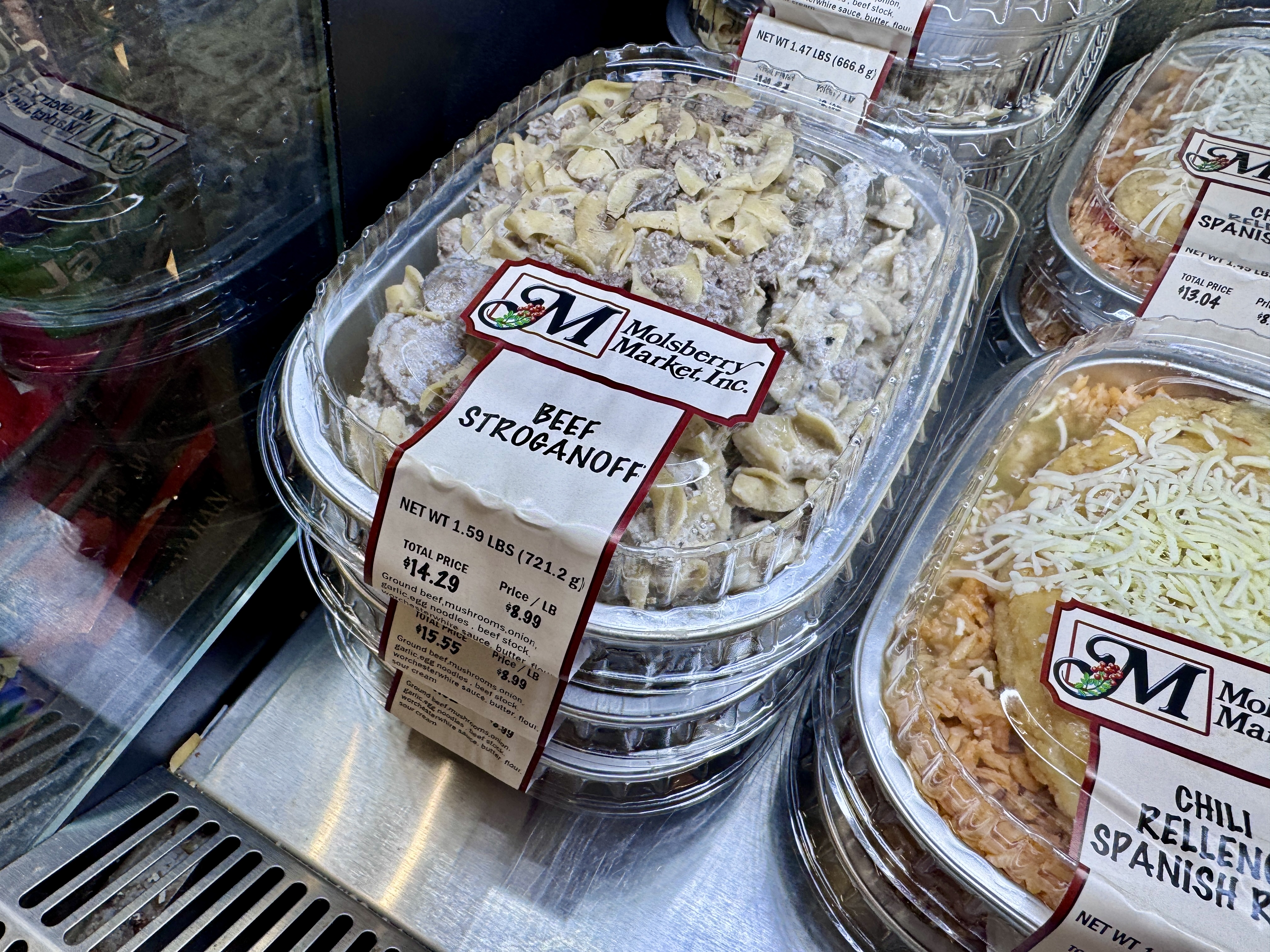
Pre-prepared beef Stroganoff for sale at a grocery store in Santa Rosa, California in 2026.

In the version often prepared in the United States today in restaurants and hotels, it consists of strips of beef filet with a mushroom, onion, and sour cream sauce, and is served over rice or noodles. Today, the dish is generally served over wide or twisted egg noodles in the United States.

== See also ==
- List of beef dishes
- List of foods named after people
- List of Russian dishes
