= Sergei Grigoryevich Stroganov =

Russian nobleman, historian, archaeologist, collector and philanthropist

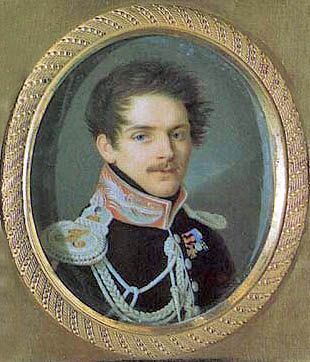
A portrait of Sergei Stroganov in his younger years by Pietro de Rossi (1761–1831).

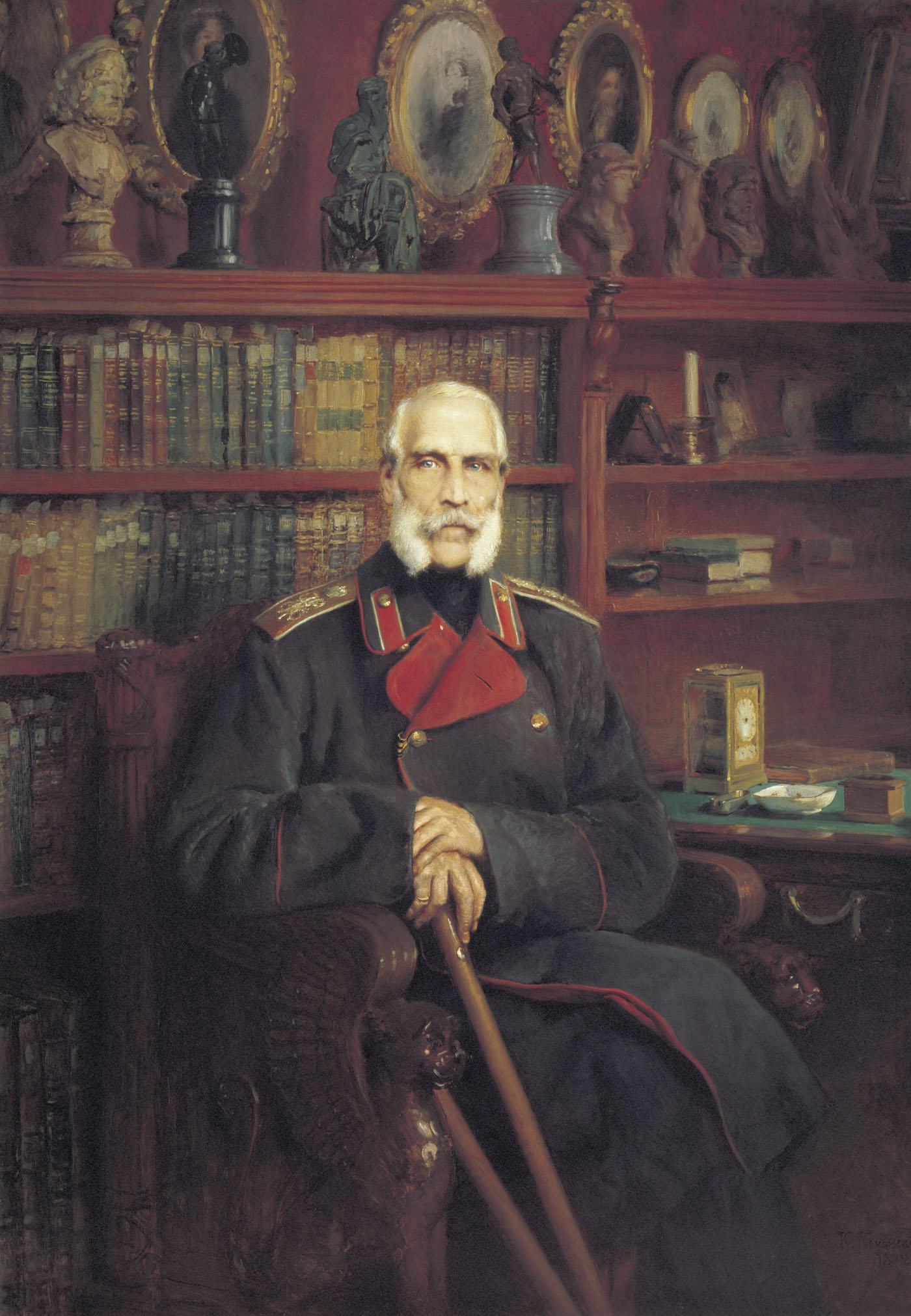
A portrait of Sergei Stroganov in his later years by Konstantin Makovsky, 1882

Count Sergei Grigoryevich Stroganov (Russian: Граф Сергей Григорьевич Строганов; 8 November 1794 – 22 March 1882) was a Russian nobleman, statesman, art historian, archaeologist, collector, and philanthropist. He was a member of the highly successful and prominent Stroganov family He also founded the Stroganov Moscow State Academy of Arts and Industry.

== Life ==
He was born in Saint Petersburg, the capital of the Russian Empire, in 1794 to Baron Grigory Stroganov (1770–1857) and Princess Anna Trubetskaya (1765–1824).

As a teenager and young adult, he fought for Russia in the Napoleonic Wars and distinguished himself at the Battle of Borodino and at the Battle of Leipzig. In 1815, Stroganov married Natalia Pavlovna Stroganova (1796–1872), daughter of Sophie Golitsyn, with whom he had four sons and three daughters. Subsequently, Stroganov participated in the Russian-Turkish War of 1828–1829 and in the Crimean War.

Count Stroganov played a large role in the development of the Russian education and culture during the 19th century. In 1825, Stroganov founded the first private academy of art in Russia (in Moscow) using his own money. This art academy taught arts and crafts to 360 people, including to children and serfs. From 1835 until 1847, Stroganov was the curator of the Moscow Educational District, which included Moscow University (now known as Moscow State University) which then flourished as a major center of Russian intellectual life. In 1860, this art academy was renamed the Stroganov School (it is now known as it Stroganov Moscow State University of Arts and Industry), and it produced many prominent architects and artists.

From 17 April 1859 to 8 September 1859, Count Stroganov served as Governor-General of Moscow. Starting in 1860, Stroganov was the tutor of Tsesarevich Nicholas Alexandrovich, Emperor Alexander II's eldest son, as well as of the younger sons of Alexander II. Stroganov also served on the State Council of the Russian Empire and was the Chairman of the Society of Russian History and Antiquities between 1837 and 1874, as well as the founder of the Archaeological Commission, which conducted excavations of old Russian towns.

As a landowner, Stroganov opposed Tsar Alexander II's emancipation of the Russian serfs in 1861. After the assassination of Alexander II in 1881, Stroganov, along with Konstantin Pobedonostsev and some others, succeeded in convincing the new Russian Tsar, Alexander III, to shelve Count Mikhail Loris-Melikov's proposal for a Russian Duma and constitution.

In 1882, Stroganov died in his Saint Petersburg home, age 87.

== Ancestors ==
Ancestors of Sergei Grigoryevich Stroganov

16. Grigory Dmitriyevich Stroganov
8. Baron Nikolay Grigoryevich Stroganov
17. Princess Maria Yakovlevna Novosiltseva
4. Baron Alexander Nikolayevich Stroganov
18. Ivan Ivanovich Buturlin
9. Praskovia Ivanovna Buturlina
19.
2. Baron Grigoriy Alexandrovich Stroganov
20. Artemiy Grigoryevich Zagryazhskiy
10. Alexandr Artemyevich Zagryazhskiy
21. Princess Anastazia Borisovna Bargratinskaya
5. Elisaveta Alexandrovna Zagryazhskaya
22. Petro Doroshenko
11. Ekaterina Alexandrovna Doroshenko
23. Agafia Borisovna Eropkina
1. Count Sergei Grigoryevich Stroganov
24. Prince Yuriy Yuryevich Trubetskoy
12. Prince Alexey Yuryevich Trubetskoy
25. Elena Grigoryevna Cherkasskaya
6. Prince Sergey Alexeyevich Trubetskoy
26. Lev Kirilovich Naryshkin
13. Anna Lvovna Naryshkina
27. Anna Petrovna Saltykova
3. Princess Anna Sergeyevna Trubetskaya
28. Prince Fyodor Ivanovich Nesvitskiy
14. Prince Vasilij Fyodorovich Nesvitskiy
29.
7. Princess Elena Vasilyevna Nesvitskaya
30. Ivan Ushakov
15. Bogdana Ivanovna Ushakova
31.
