= Korv stroganoff =

Swedish meat dish

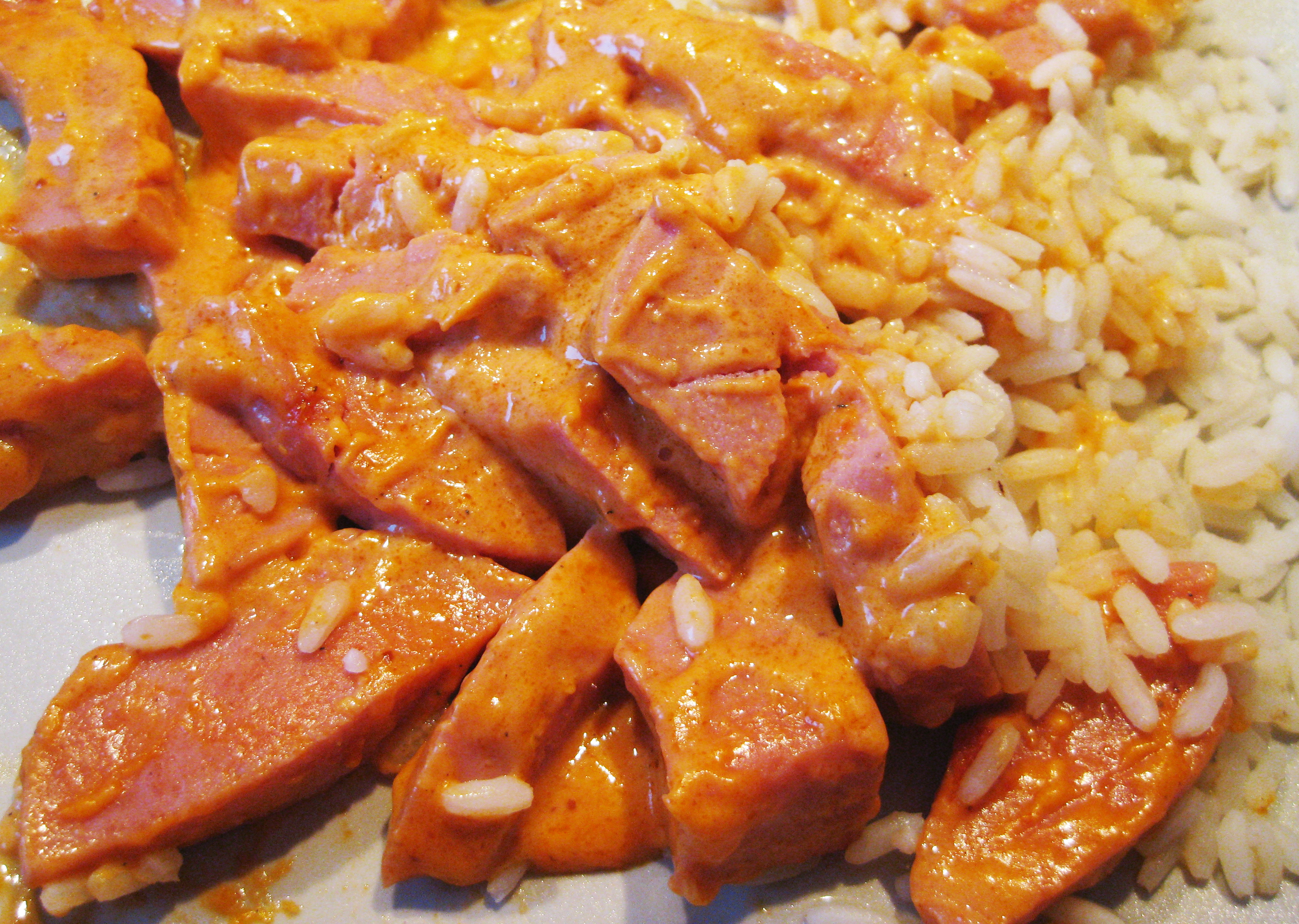
Korv Stroganoff made with falukorv and served with rice

Recipe base
- Step 1: chop sausage + yellow onion
- Step 2: sautéing (optional)
- Step 3: add tomato-base + dairy
- Step 4: cook with spices until done
- Step 5: serve with side (rice/pasta etc)

Korv stroganoff or korvstroganoff, Swedish for sausage stroganoff, is a Swedish dish, originally based on the Russian dish beef Stroganoff, where the beef is replaced with pieces of sausage (traditionally falukorv) and the sauce features a partial tomato base.

== History ==
Korv Stroganoff originated as a budget-friendly variation of beef Stroganoff, first introduced as a school meal in the 1950s, before spreading to households. It has since become a staple of Swedish cuisine, later also spreading to other countries. In Finnish, the dish is called makkarastroganoff (lit. 'sausage stroganoff').

The dish was Sweden's fifth most popular dish in 2022.

== Description ==
The recipe can vary, but typically consists of chopped sausage and chopped yellow onions, which are often sautéed beforehand, sometimes together with tomato paste and flour. The sausage is typically falukorv by tradition, but any sausage of choice can be used, like Swedish style chorizo, Vienna sausage, or even hotdog leftovers.

These are cooked in a tomato- and dairy-based sauce (some rare variations skip the dairy), potentially tossed into the same cooking vessel used to sauté the sausage and onion before. The tomato component can be tomato sauce (like canned crushed tomatoes), tomato purée, tomato paste, or a combination of types, but some people also use ketchup or thereof. The dairy component can be anything from cream, sour cream, crème fraîche, smetana, milk, or filmjölk. A poor man's (student) version simply use ketchup and milk for the sauce.

Spices vary greatly, and may be simple, like salt and pepper, or varied to preference, like the use of paprika, or soy sauce, or Italian seasoning (dry or fresh), such as basil, oregano, rosemary and garlic. Flavorings such as Dijon mustard and thickeners like flour may be added.

The dish is traditionally served with rice, but pasta is also quite typical, and alternatives, such as boiled potatoes, fried potatoes, mashed potatoes, bulgur, quinoa, oat rice or wheat berries, also occur.

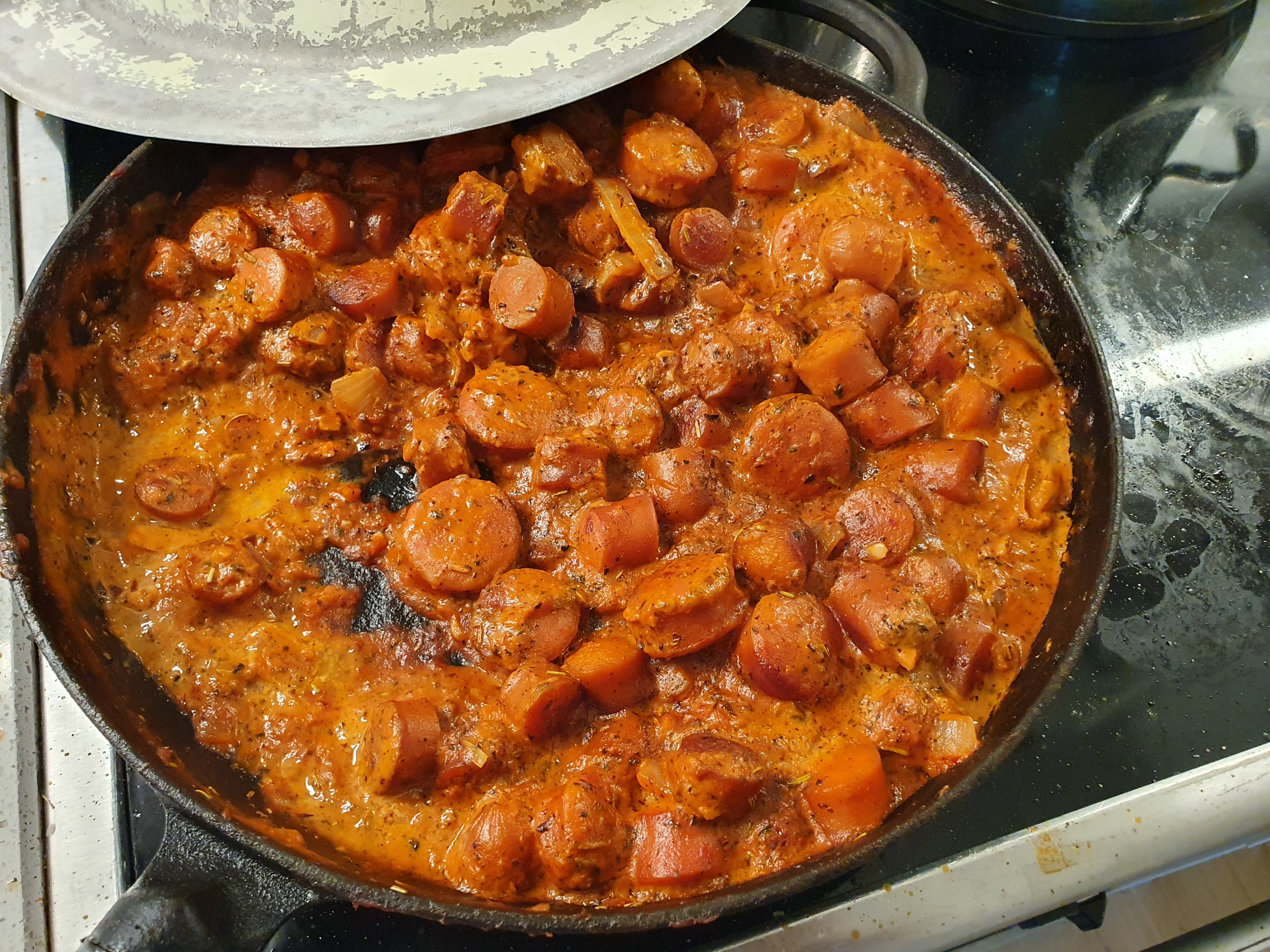
Korv stroganoff made with various different chopped sausages

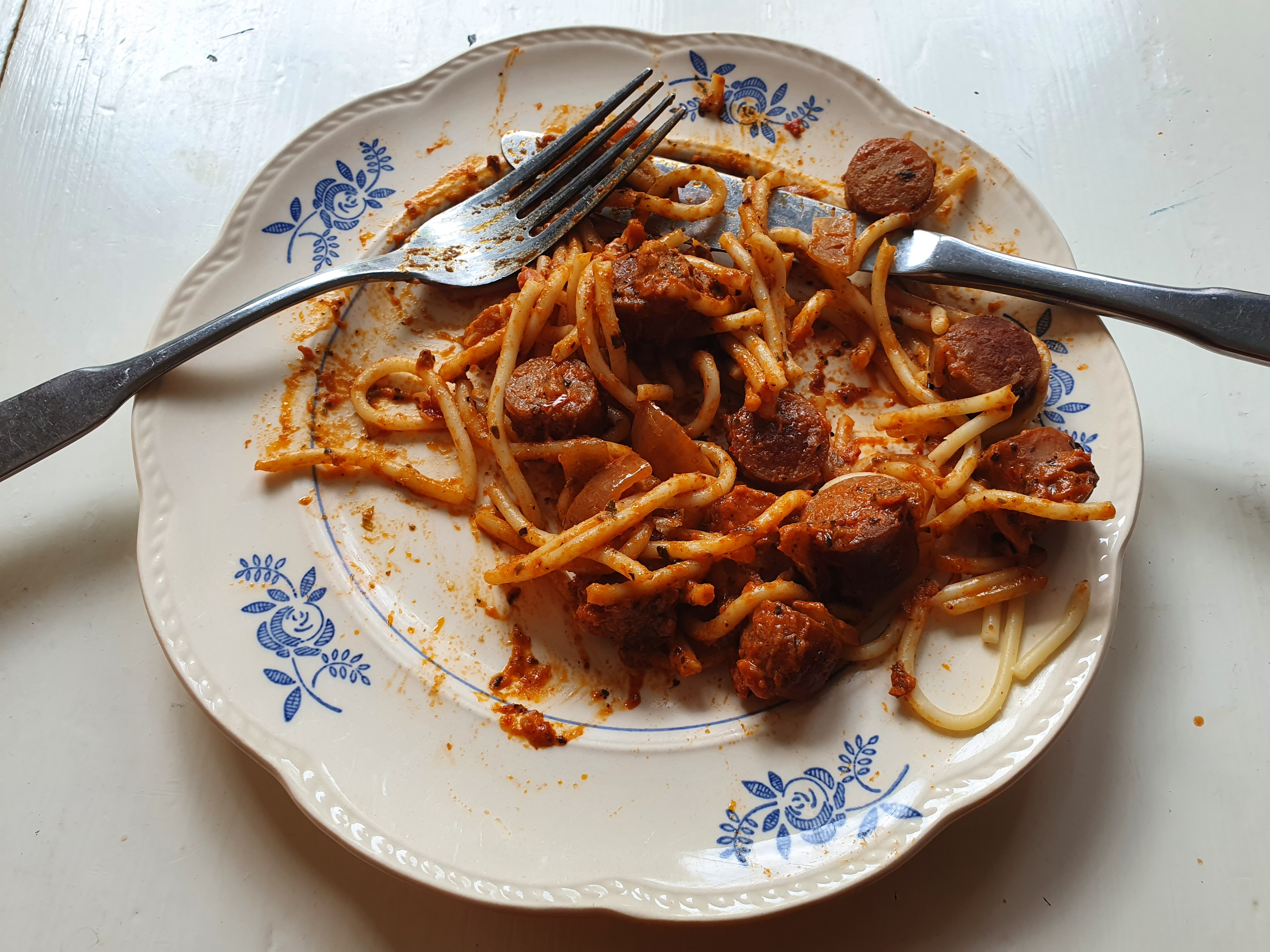
Plated korv stroganoff with pasta

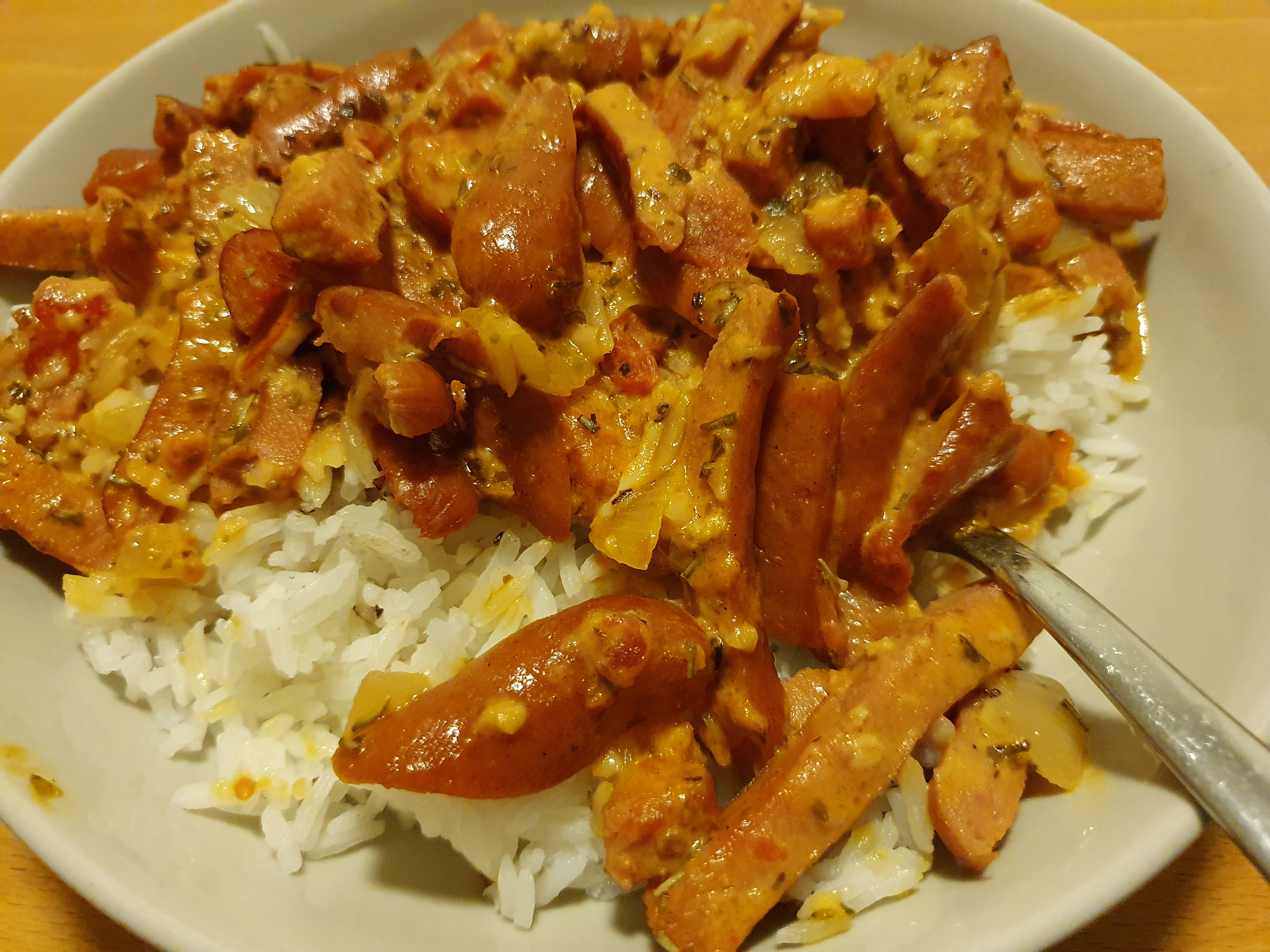
Korv stroganoff with lean chorizo cut lengthwise
