= Alexander Stroganov =

Russian statesman and general (1796–1891)

Count Alexander Grigoryevich Stroganov
- Александр Григорьевич Строганов
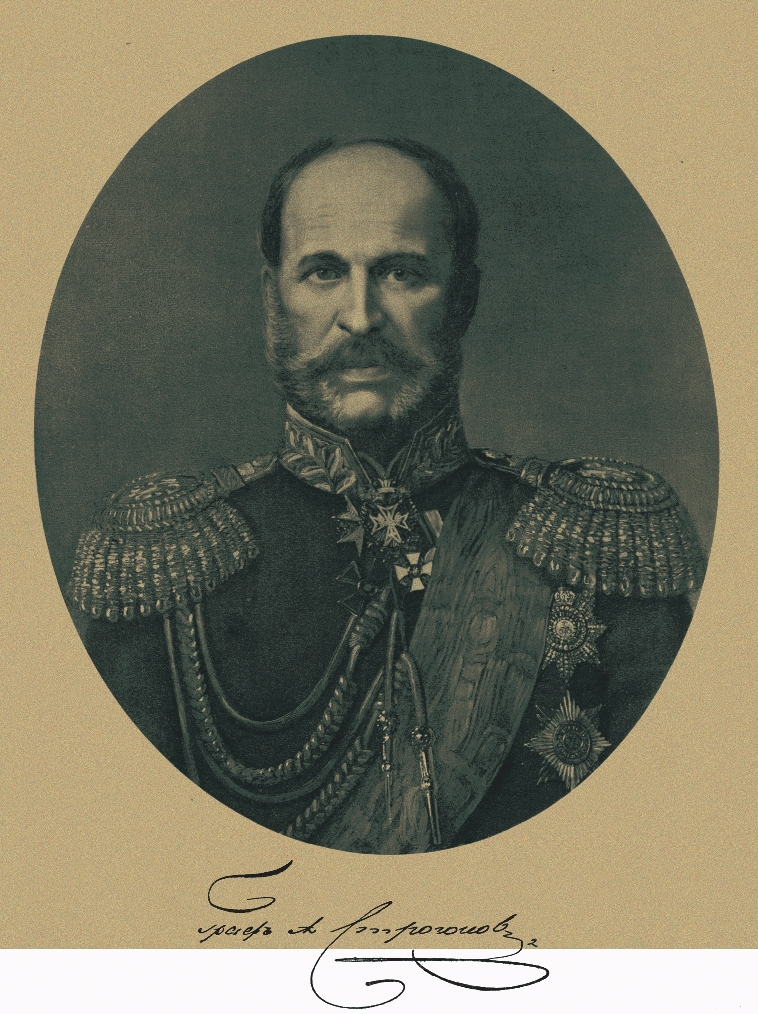

Minister of Internal Affairs of Russia
- In office 1839–1841
- Preceded by: Dmitry Bludov
- Succeeded by: Lev Perovski

Personal details
- Born: January 11, 1796 Saint Petersburg, Russian Empire
- Died: August 14, 1891 (aged 95) Odessa, Kherson Governorate, Russian Empire

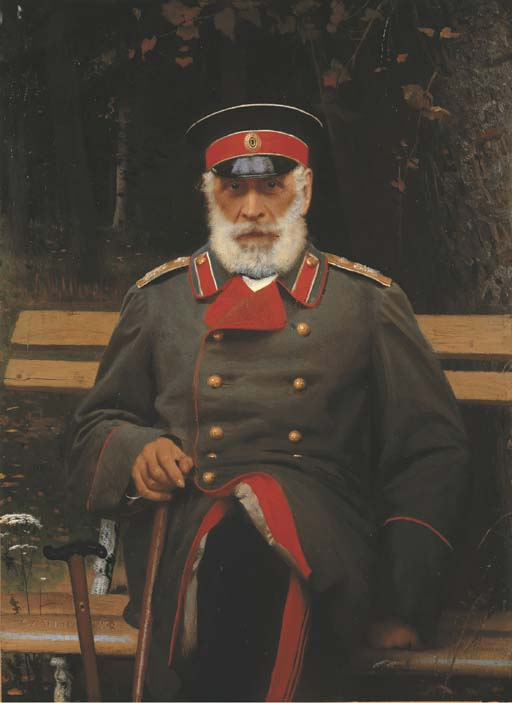
1882 portrait by Ivan Kramskoi

Count Alexander Grigoryevich Stroganov (Russian: Александр Григорьевич Строганов; (Note: Pre-reform spelling: Александръ Григорьевичъ Строгановъ) 11 January 1796 [O.S. 31 December 1795] – 14 August [O.S. 2 August] 1891) was a Russian Imperial statesman who served as the minister of the interior from 1839 to 1841 and then as a member of the State Council from 1849. He also served as the governor-general of Novorossiya and Bessarabia from 1855 to 1863. He was a member of the Stroganov family.

== See also ==
- List of Russian commanders in the French invasion of Russia

== Sources ==
- "Строгановы" . Brockhaus and Efron Encyclopedic Dictionary (in Russian). 1906.
