= Stroganov family =

Russian family of merchants and statesmen

Stroganov Стро́гановы
- Merchants, nobility
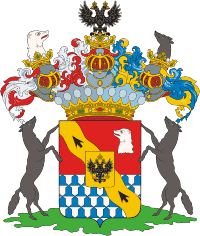
- Arms of Counts Stroganov

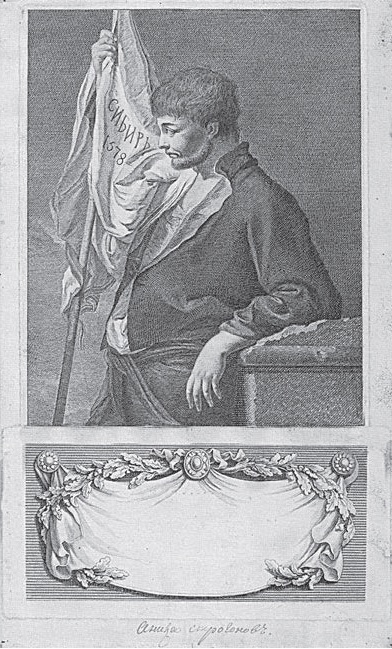
- Anikey Stroganov, progenitor of the ennobled branch
- Current region: Muscovy, Russian Empire
- Origin: Disputed: Veliky Novgorod, Pomor
- Founded: 15th century
- Founder: Spiridon Stroganov; Fyodor Lukich Stroganov (the Solvychegodsk branch).
- Current head: Noble branch is extinct; the family continues in its non-noble senior line.
- Distinctions: One of the richest Russian families in history Beef Stroganoff Stroganov school of icon painting

The House of Stroganov or Strogonov (Russian: Стро́гановы, Стро́гоновы), French spelling: Stroganoff, was a Russian noble family of highly successful Russian merchants, industrialists, landowners, and statesmen. From the time of Ivan the Terrible (r. 1533–1584) they were the richest businessmen in the Tsardom of Russia. They financed the Russian conquest of Siberia (1580 onwards) and Prince Pozharsky's 1612 reconquest of Moscow from the Poles. The Stroganov school of icon-painting (late 16th and 17th centuries) takes its name from them. The most recent common ancestor of the family was Fyodor Lukich Stroganov (died 1497), a salt industrialist. His elder son, Vladimir, became the founder of a branch whose members eventually became state peasants; this lineage continues. The lineage from Fyodor Lukich Stroganov's youngest son, Anikey (1488–1570), died out in 1923. Anikey's descendants became members of the high Russian nobility under the first Romanovs (tsars from 1613 onwards).

== Origins ==
There are several theories of the family's origins. It was formerly believed that the family's progenitor was a merchant in Veliky Novgorod. However, the historian Andrey Vvedensky concluded in his research on the family's genealogy, that they must have originated from wealthy Pomor peasants (i.e. Russians from Russia's subarctic north, in the region of the White Sea).

The family's earliest known ancestor was named Spiridon; he lived during the rule of Duke Dmitry Donskoy and was mentioned in the 1390s. His grandson, Luka Kuzmich Stroganov, was a renter of royal properties in the region of the Northern Dvina; he is claimed to have redeemed Duke Vasily II of Moscow from Tatar imprisonment in 1445.

His son, Fyodor Lukich Stroganov (d. 1497), the latest common ancestor of the family, settled in Solvychegodsk (also in the Russian north). He was a local salt industrialist and owner of properties in town, which he passed down to his elder son, Vladimir. He had two brothers, Semyon and Ivan, whose descendants are unknown. He also had six sons: Stefan, Joseph (Osip), Vladimir, Ivan nicknamed Vyshnyak, Afanasy and Anikey, and a daughter named Maura.

In 1517, the three oldest brothers, Stefan, Joseph and Vladimir Stroganov, received a wood and a salt mine in Ustyug district. Vladimir Stroganov's lineage continues in the direct male line. However, his descendants became state peasants.

His youngest son, Anikey Fyodorovich Stroganov (1488–1570) was the progenitor of the ennobled lineage of the Stroganov family. This lineage is now extinct. He opened the salterns in 1515, which would later become a huge industry. In 1558, Ivan the Terrible granted to Anikey Stroganov and his successors large estates in what was at the time the eastern edge of Russian settlement, along the Kama and Chusovaya Rivers.

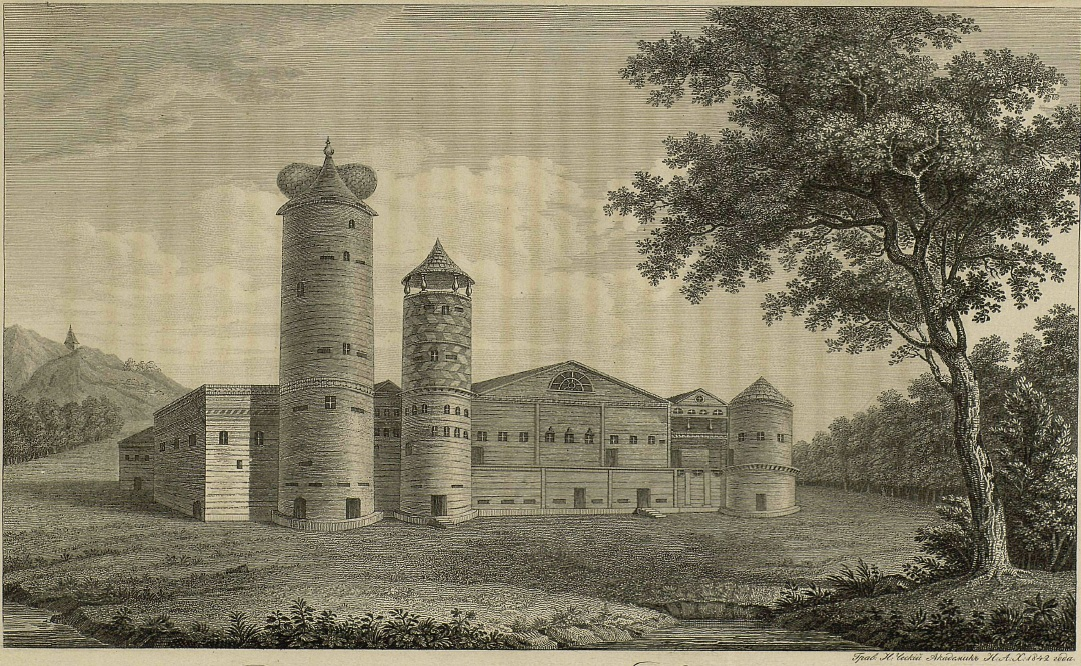
17th century Stroganov country house in Solvychegodsk

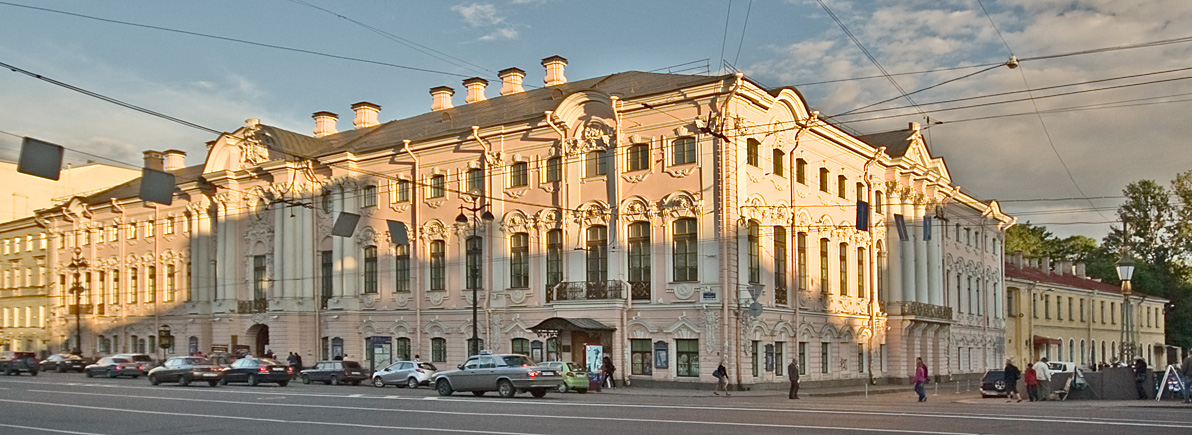
The Stroganov Palace on Nevsky Avenue in St Petersburg was designed by Bartolomeo Rastrelli

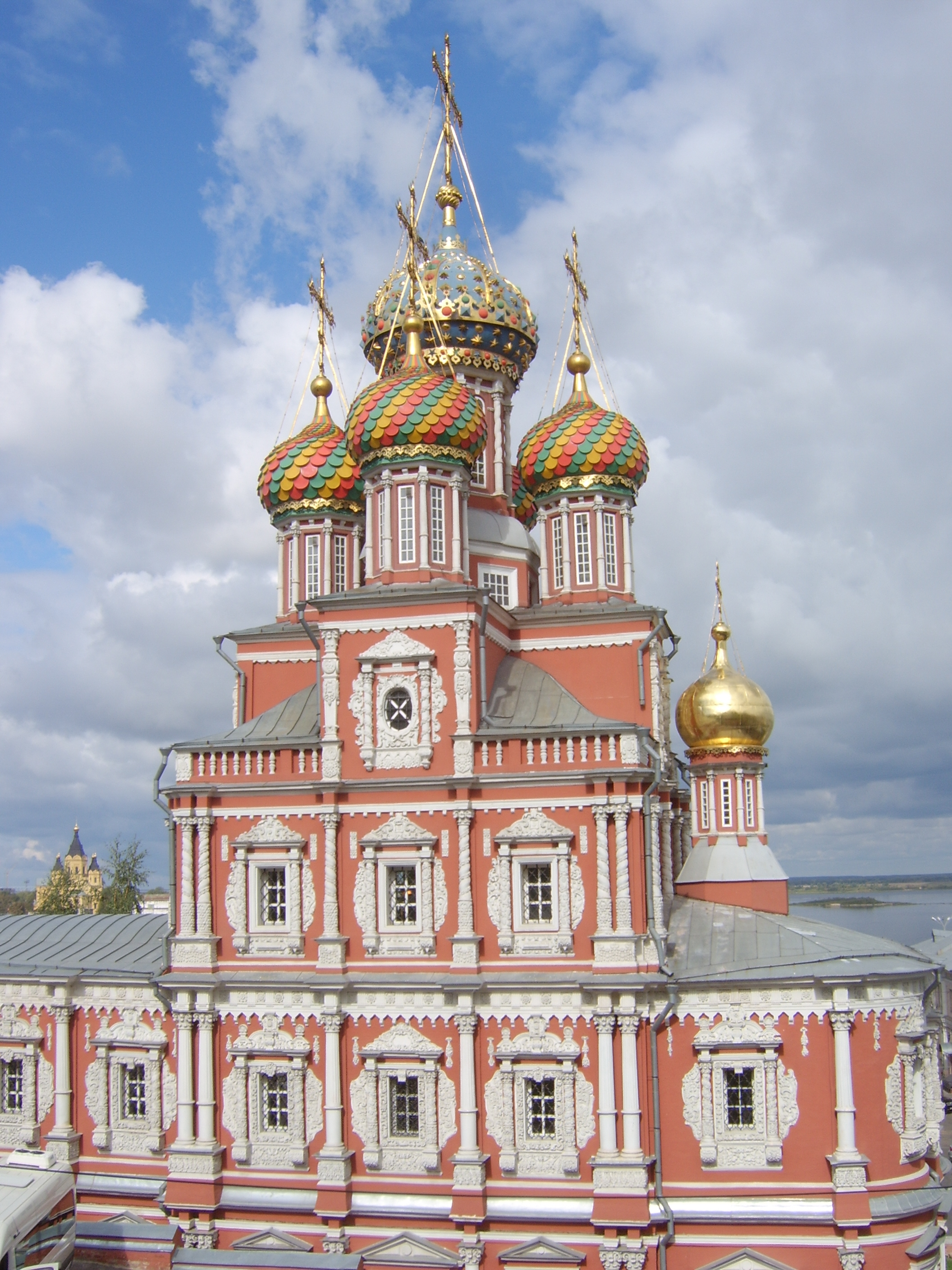
The Baroque Church of the Synaxis of the Mother of God in Nizhny Novgorod underwritten by the Stroganovs in 1697

In 1566, at their own request, their lands were included in the "oprichnina", the territory within Russia under the direct authority of Ivan the Terrible. Seizing lands from the local population by conquest and colonizing them with incoming Russian peasants, the Stroganovs developed farming, hunting, saltworks, fishing, and ore mining in these areas. They built towns and fortresses and, at the same time, suppressed local unrest with the help of a small private army (such private units were known as "druzhinas"), and annexed new lands in the Urals and Siberia in favor of Russia.

Yakov Anikeevich Stroganov (1528–1577) made Ivan the Terrible forbid the English to trade near Solvychegodsk; he, alongside his brothers, received the right to organize military attacks on Siberian tribes and rulers. He was a provider to the tsar of luxuries, including sable fur. In 1574, together with brother Grigory, he was granted large lands in Siberia, along the Ob River. In 1577, he was granted iron bogs and a forest in Sodrolinskaya volost with the right to establish ironworks there.

Grigory Anikeevich Stroganov (1533–1577) received large lands in the basin of the Kama river, in the region of Perm. In 1558 he was allowed producing saltpetre. In 1564 he was given the privilege of establishing a town named Kargedan, which was later known as Oryol-gorodok.

Semyon Anikeyevich Stroganov (? – 1609) and Anikey's grandsons Maksim Yakovlevich (? – 1620s) and Nikita Grigoriyevich (? – 1620) are believed to be initiators and sponsors of Yermak's Siberian campaign in 1581.

By the late 16th century, the Stroganovs had become enormously large landowners and salt industrialists. In the early 17th century, owing to the Turmoil, they strengthened their positions by sponsoring the central government's struggle against claimants to the throne and Polish invaders. The family started to gradually merge with the nobility. In 1608 Kozma Danilovich Stroganov (1580–1617) was the voivode at Totma. He died without issue.

During the period of Polish intervention in the early 17th century, the Stroganovs offered humanitarian and military support to the Russian government (some 842,000 rubles just in terms of money), for which they received the title of 'eminent men' (imenitye lyudi) in 1610, and allowed official reference with the 'vich' ending to their paternal names, as was only meant for the members of the royal court. Together with the new title, the received unprecedented privileges for people of trading class: they were subject only to the royal judgement, allowed founding towns and building fortresses, owning armed troops and forging cannons, organizing military campaigns against Siberian rulers and duty-free trade with Asian nations.

In the 17th century, the Stroganovs began to marry into high Russian nobility (princes, boyars and courtiers). For example, Pyotr Semyonovich Stroganov (1583–1639) married Matryona Ivanovna Borbischeva-Pushkina. Maksim Maksimovich Stroganov (1603–1627) married Anna Alferyevna Streshneva, cousin of tsarina Eudoxia Streshneva. Stroganovs married daughters of voivodes and courtiers. Amongst the families they intermarried with in the 1600s were a few princely families, such as the Volkonskys, the Mescherskys, the Baryatinsky, the Golitzines, as well as untitled Rurikids, the Dmitriev-Mamonov family, and such boyar families as Saltykovs and Miloslavsky.

In the 17th century, the Stroganovs invested heavily in the salt industry in Solikamsk. In the 1680s, Grigory Dmitriyevich Stroganov (1656–1715) united all the scattered lands of the heirs of the children of Anikey Stroganov. He also annexed the saltworks, which belonged to the Shustov and Filatiyev families. In the 18th century, the Stroganovs established a number of ironworks and copper-smelting factories in the Urals.

A number of remarkable Baroque churches throughout Russia were built by the Stroganov family in the late 17th and early 18th century. They include the Cathedral of the Presentation of Mary (Введенский собор) in Solvychegodsk (1688–1696), Church of Our Lady of Kazan in Ustyuzhna (1694), Church of Our Lady of Smolensk (церковь Смоленской Богоматери) in Gordeyevka (part of today's Kanavino district of Nizhny Novgorod) (1697), and the Church of the Synaxis of the Mother of God in Nizhny Novgorod (started in 1697, consecrated in 1719).

== Senior lineage of the Stroganovs ==
The descendants of Vladimir Fyodorovich Stroganov, one of the elder sons of Fyodor Lukich Stroganov, had become impoverished by the 18th century, and entered the class of state peasants. Vladimir inherited his father's properties in Solvychegodsk. Later he purchased the village of Tsyrennikovo, to the north of Solvychegodsk, for a hundred rubles. This place was the family seat of this branch for generations. Afanasy Vladimirovich Stroganov (d. 1607) was engaged in the local salt business and the fur trade. With the income from these, he purchased lands around his village. Afanasy received the title of gost (eminent merchant). He was also a tenant of a royal estate near Solvychegorsk. Afanasy Vladimirovich was still accepted as a relative by Anika's family. But his son, Ivan, was the first of this branch in a continuous downhill trend, both financially and socially.

The breach between the wealthy descendants of Anika Stroganov and the poor senior branch of the family had formed by the 1670s, when the wealthy part of the family denied their relationship with the poor one. This may have resulted in the myth of that Anika's elder brothers supposedly died childless.

By the late 17th century the living conditions of the poor branch of the Stroganovs were scarcely distinguishable from those of common peasants. Being severely impoverished, this branch began to get involved in manual labour and even robbery. One of this branch, Andrey Vasilyev syn Stroganov, was amongst the Russian pioneers in Siberia in the 17th century. He established strongholds in the Zabaykaliya region. He was later raised to be a head of a Cossack troop.

According to the information gathered by historian A. Vvedensky, when in Saint Petersburg the poor relatives visited their wealthy relation's palace located at the crossing of Moyka Street and Nevsky Boulevard, but the servants were ordered to kick those relatives out.

In 1911, Count Pavel Sergeevich Stroganov died without issue. His fortune of 120 million rubles was to go to the state. The famous lawyer Maklakov initiated research to prove a relationship between the late count and the Stroganovs from Tsyrennikovo. In court Maklakov contended with the late count's relations in the female line; but he won the case. Maklakov settled at Tsyrennikovo, wishing to share the inheritance with Stroganov's relations. However, the inheritance got stuck in red tape. Then the Revolution intervened, and prevented the poor Stroganov branch from coming into their inheritance.

== Stroganov noble branch ==
The titled branch of the Stroganov family was descended from Anikey Stroganov, the youngest son of Fyodor Lukich Stroganov (d. 1497). Since the 17th century Anika's descendants were very close to the royal court; they mingled with the highest nobility and even intermarried with some. During this time of their prime, they started to alienate their impoverished, almost peasant, relations from the senior line, to the extreme of completely denying the fact of relation.

One of the descendants, Grigory Dmitrievich Stroganov (1656–1715), was a supporter of Peter the Great. He was frequently invited to the court of tsar Alexey Romanov, including invitations to his private dinners. He granted his four military ships built in Voronezh and Astrakhan to Peter the Great. Grigory's sons were rewarded with the baronial title by Peter the Great in 1722.

During the Great Northern War of 1700–1721, the Stroganovs rendered sizable financial support to the government of Peter the Great, for which Alexander Grigoriyevich, Nikolay Grigoriyevich, and Sergei Grigoriyevich would be raised to the rank of baron in 1722 and later to that of count.

From then on, the Stroganovs were members of the Russian aristocracy and held important government posts.

- Sergei Grigoryevich Stroganov (1707–1756) played a significant role during the reign of Elizabeth Petrovna.
- His son Alexander Sergeyevich (1733–1811) was a member of the commission on elaborating the new code of laws during the reign of Catherine the Great. In the late 18th – early 19th century, he held different posts, such as president of the Russian Academy of Arts, art director of the Public Library, and member of the State Council.
- Pavel Alexandrovich Stroganov (1772–1817) was a member of the Private Committee (Негласный комитет) of Alexander I and assistant to the minister of the interior.
- Sergei Grigoryevich Stroganov (1794–1882) was the governor general of Moscow in 1859–1860. He founded Stroganov Moscow Arts and Industrial Institute in 1825.
- Alexander Grigoriyevich Stroganov (1795–1891) was the minister of the interior in 1839–1841 and then a member of the State Council (since 1849).

Most of the Stroganovs are known to have shown interest for art, literature, history, and archaeology. They used to own rich libraries, collections of paintings, coins, medals etc. Stroganov Palace (now one of the buildings of the State Russian Museum) is among the chief sights of Nevsky Prospekt in Saint Petersburg.

In 1911, Count Pavel Sergeyevich Stroganov died without issue. His death stirred litigation for his fortune between his relations in female lines and the senior unnoble descendants of the Stroganov family.

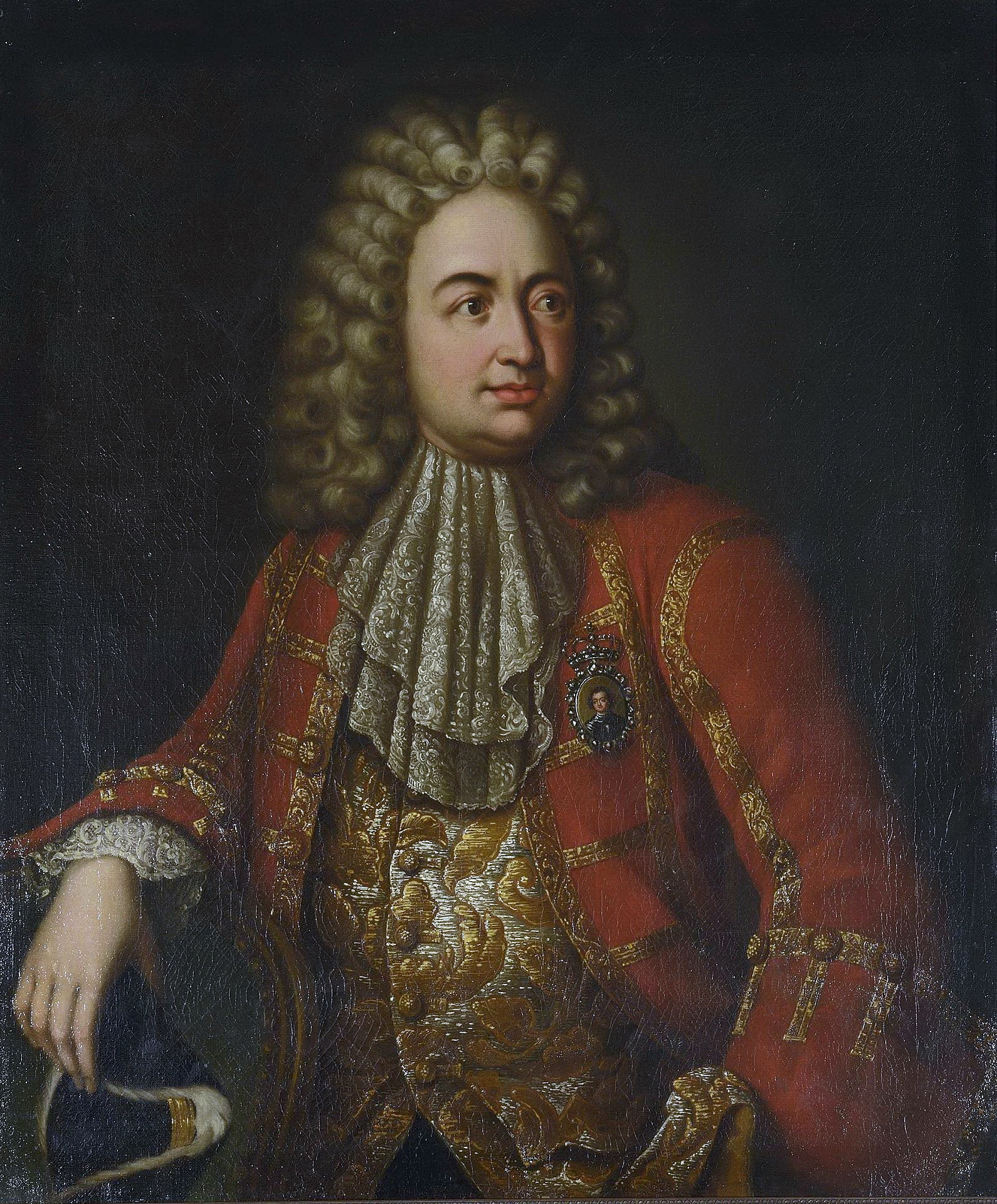
Grigory Dmitriyevich Stroganov (anonymous)

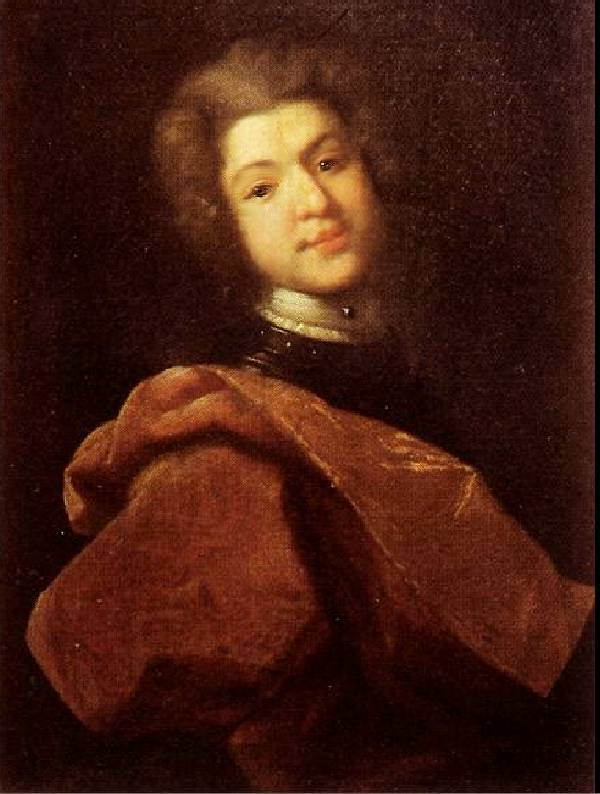
Sergei Grigoryevich Stroganov (1707–1756) by Ivan Nikitin (1726)

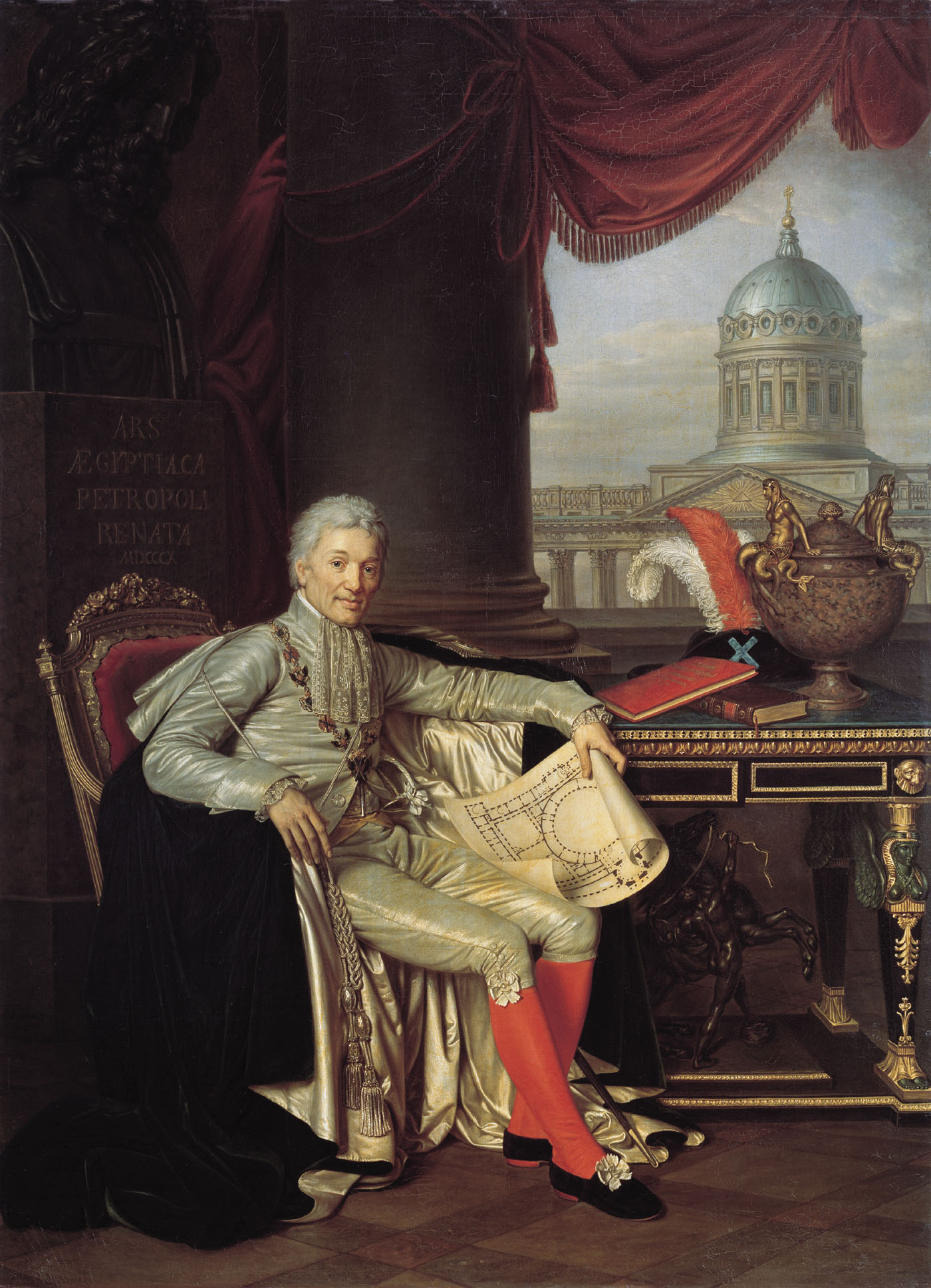
Portrait of Alexander Sergeyevich Stroganov by Alexander Varnek (1814)

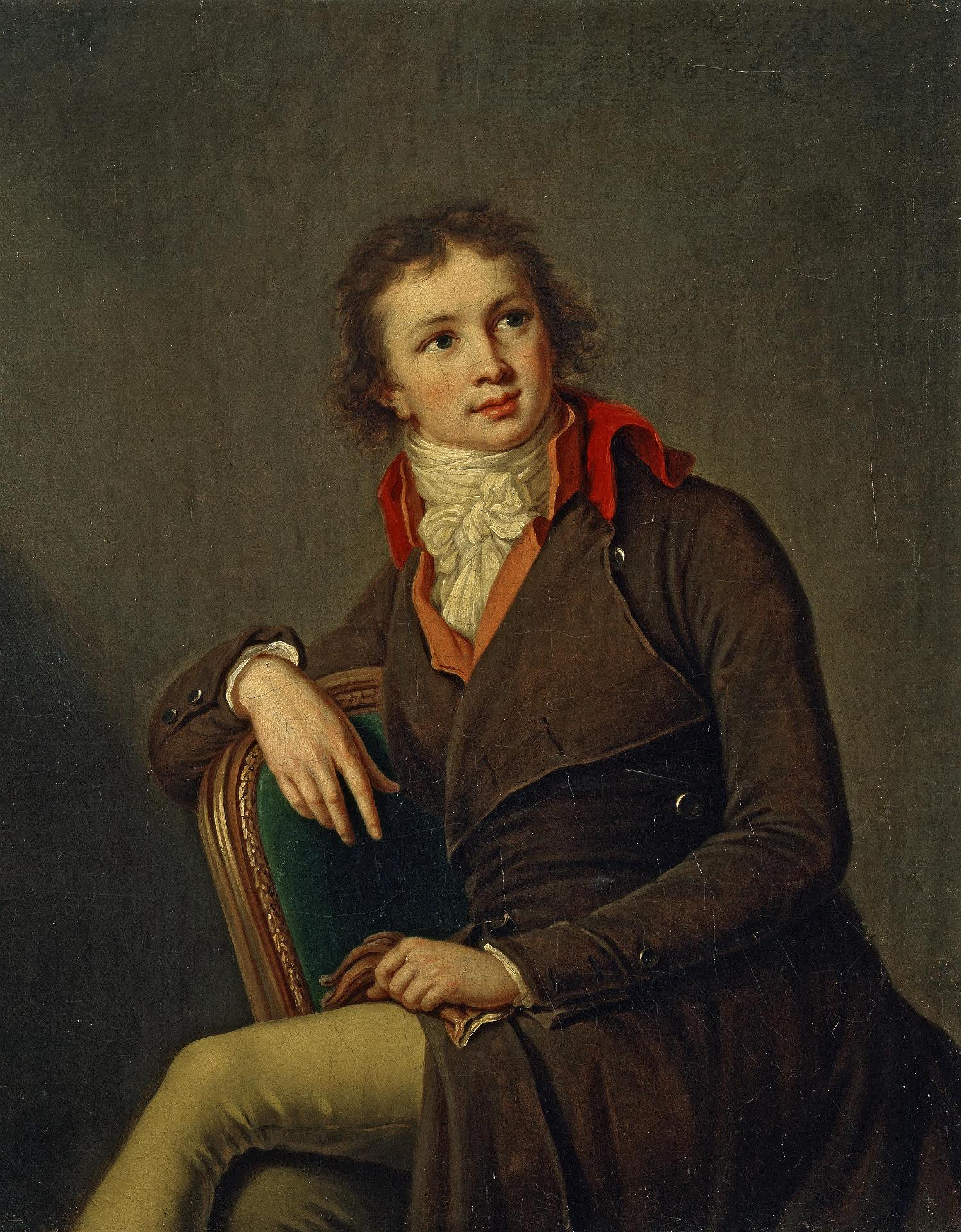
Portrait of Pavel Alexandrovich Stroganov by Élisabeth Vigée Le Brun (1790's)

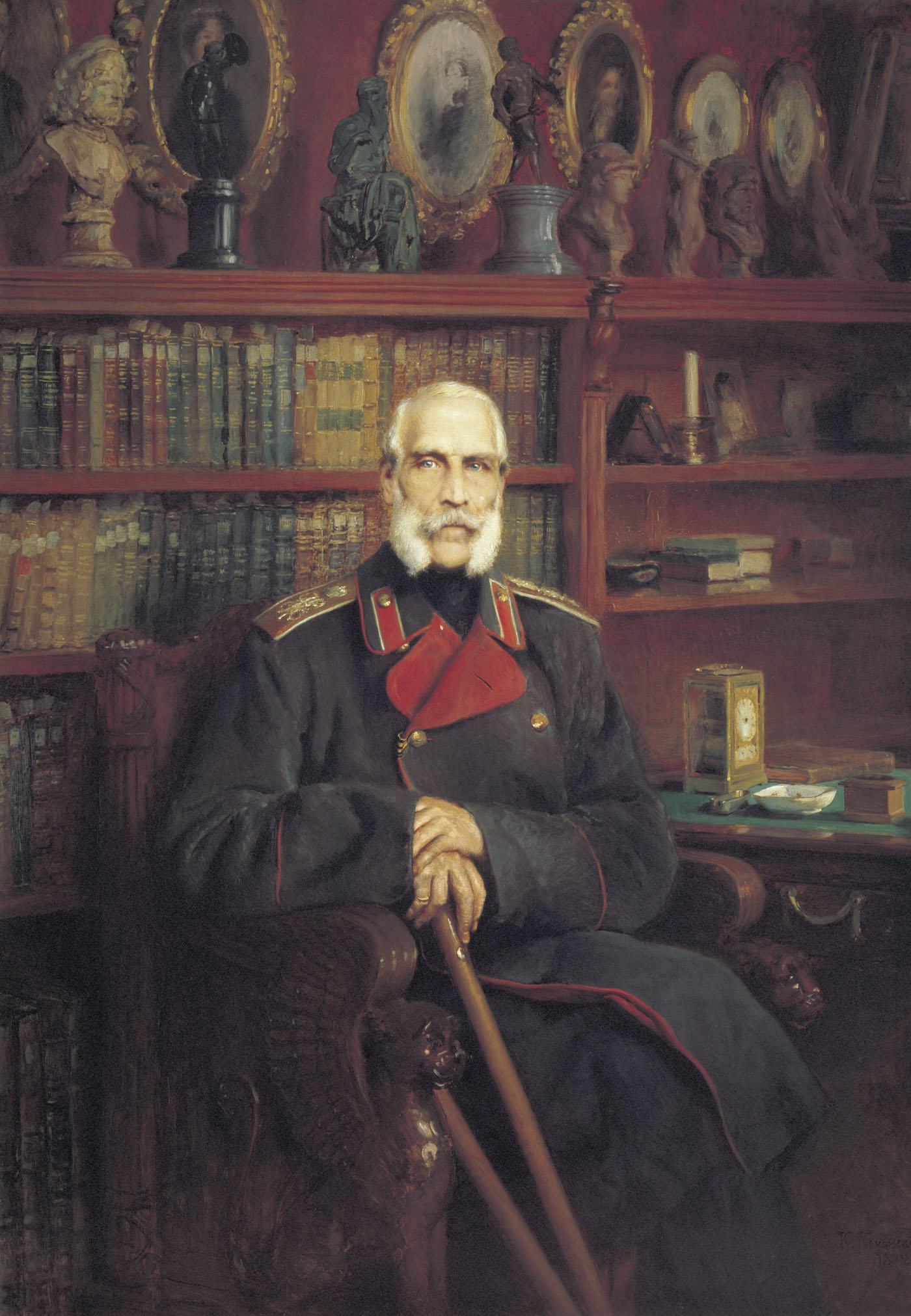
Count Sergei G. Stroganov by Konstantin Makovsky, 1881

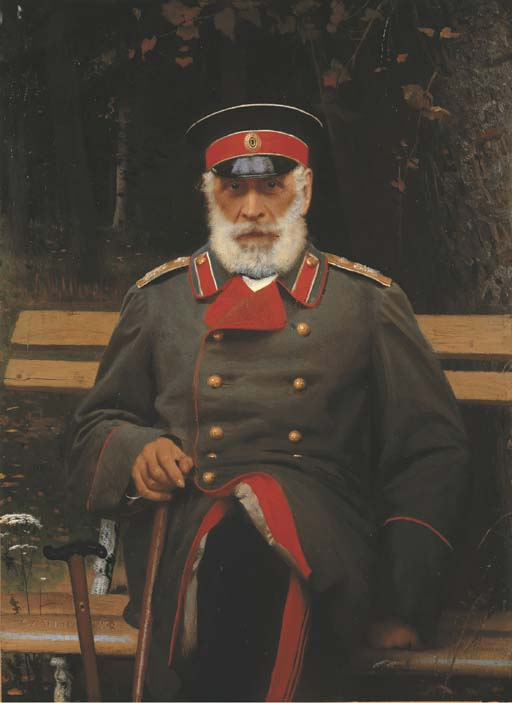
Portrait of Alexander Stroganov by Ivan Kramskoy (1882)

== Modern times ==
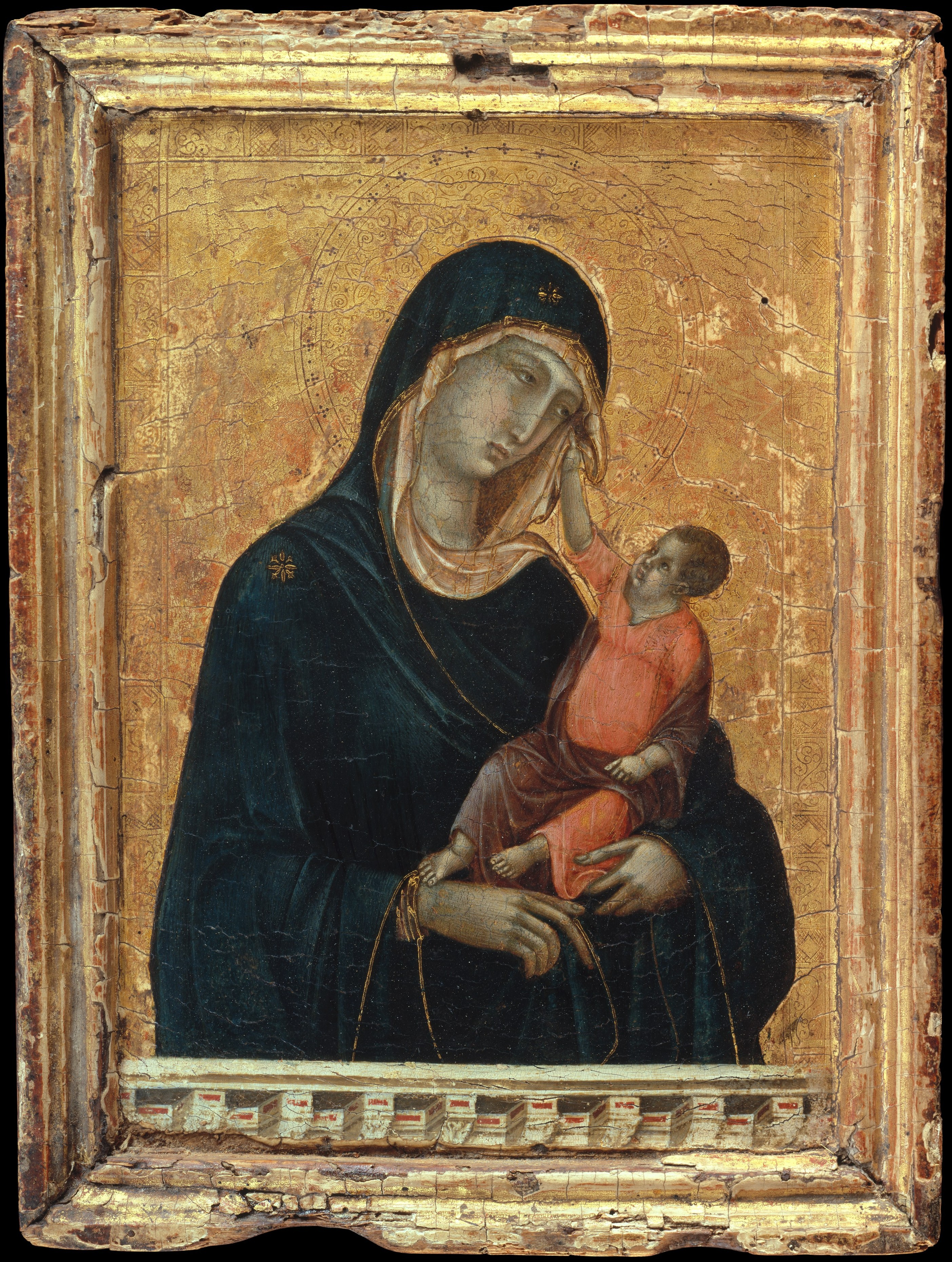
The Stroganoff Madonna by Duccio

After the Russian Revolution of 1917 the Stroganov family emigrated with the White movement and all family property in Russia was nationalized.

The Stroganov Foundation, created in 1992 in New York City as a not-for-profit corporation, is dedicated to the conservation and restoration of the Russian heritage of the Stroganov family.

The establishment of the Stroganov Foundation was the inspiration of Baroness Hélène de Ludinghausen, who lives in Paris and whose mother, Princess Xenia Alexandrovna Shcherbatova-Stroganova, was born in the Stroganov Palace.

The lineage traced to the youngest brother, Anikey Stroganov, (the ennobled branch) died out in male line in 1923. The peasant lineage traced from the elder brother Vladimir Stroganov continues to date.

== See also ==
- Beef Stroganoff is named after the family
- Stroganov school of icon painting
- Demidov family
