= Tsipikan =

Tsipikan Ципикан
- Settlement
- Location within Republic of Buryatia Location within Russia
- Coordinates: 54°55′N 113°21′E
- Country: Russia
- Region: Republic of Buryatia
- District: Bauntovsky District
- Time zone: UTC+8:00

Tsipikan (Russian: Ципикан) is a rural locality (a settlement) in Bauntovsky District, Republic of Buryatia, Russia. The population was 69 as of 2010. There are 5 streets.

== Geography ==
Tsipikan is located 72 kilometres (45 mi) north of Bagdarin (the district's administrative centre) on the right bank of the Tsipikan river, south of the eastern end of the Bolshoy Khapton. Kurort Baunt is the nearest rural locality.
