= Busani =

Lake in Buryatia, Russia

- Бусани
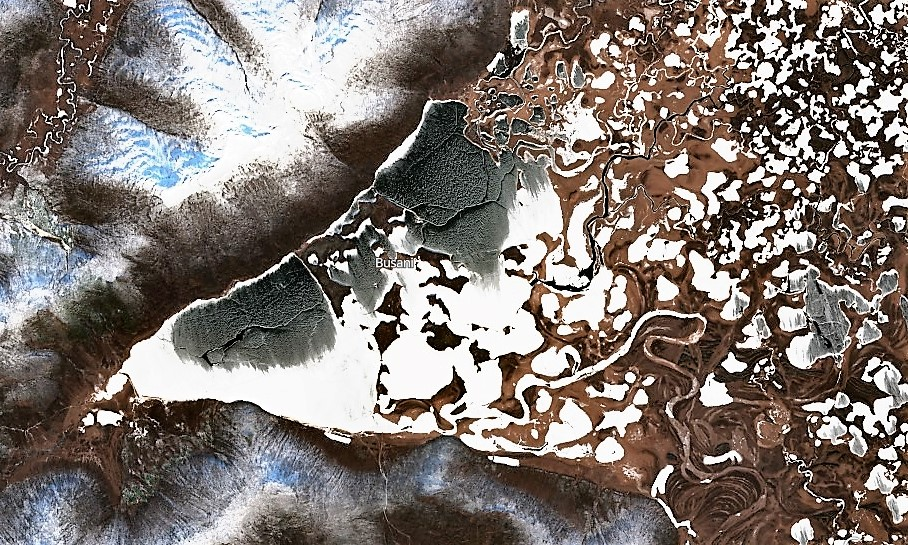
- Sentinel-2 image of the lake in October.

- Location in Buryatia, Russian Far East
- Location: Vitim Plateau; South Siberian System
- Coordinates: 55°20′30″N 113°30′42″E
- Primary inflows: Tsipa, Mogoi
- Primary outflows: Tsipa
- Catchment area: 241 km^{2} (93 sq mi)
- Basin countries: Buryatia, Russia
- Max. length: 12 km (7.5 mi)
- Max. width: 8.5 km (5.3 mi)
- Surface area: 36.8 km^{2} (14.2 sq mi)
- Max. depth: 10 m (33 ft)
- Surface elevation: 1,050 m (3,445 ft)
- Settlements: Uakit, Busani, Baunt

Busani (Russian: Бусани) is the name of a body of fresh water in the Bauntovsky District, Buryatia, Russia. The name originated in the Evenki language, meaning "where people drown".

There are spectacular rock formations on the southeastern shore of lake Busani. It was declared a protected area of Russia on 25 July 1988.

== Geography ==
Busani is one of the major lakes of the Baunt Depression, below the southern foothills of the Southern Muya Range. The lake area belongs to the "Tsipo-Tsipikansky" (Ципо-Ципиканских) lake group —named after rivers Tsipa and Tsipikan, which is also known as Bauntovsky (Баунтовских) —after neighboring lake Baunt.

The lake is located at the northwestern corner of the Vitim Plateau, east of lake Baunt. It is a triangular-shaped lake, crossed by the Mogoi river, which connects it with river Tsipa. On the southwestern coast there is a hot spring.

The middle of the lake has a section stretching from north to south of irregular-shaped islands and peninsulas with deeply indented shorelines. The village of Busani is located in that area.

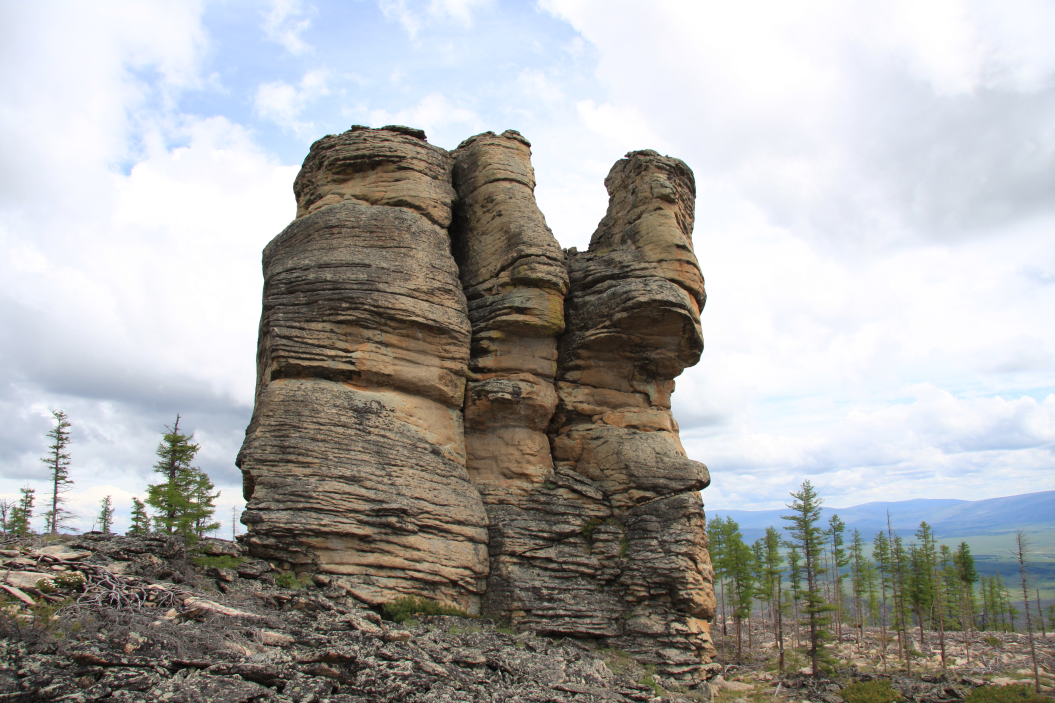
The Three Brothers rock formation near the Busani lakeshore.

== Flora and fauna ==
The bottom of the lake is covered with dense aquatic plant growth. Water lilies rise above the surface in the warm season. The hills surrounding the lake, as well as the islands, are covered with Dahurian larch, Dahurian rhododendron and dwarf cedar.

The lake is rich in fish species, such as ruffe, grayling and Arctic char.

== See also ==
- List of lakes of Russia
