= Okunevo, Republic of Buryatia =

Okunevo Окунево
- Settlement
- Location within Republic of Buryatia Location within Russia
- Coordinates: 54°50′N 112°20′E
- Country: Russia
- Region: Republic of Buryatia
- District: Bauntovsky District
- Time zone: UTC+8:00

Okunevo (Russian: Окунево) is a rural locality (a settlement) in Bauntovsky District, Republic of Buryatia, Russia. The population was 6 as of 2010. There are 4 streets.

== Geography ==
Okunevo is located by lake Kapylyushi, in the Tsipikan river valley, 113 km northwest of Bagdarin (the district's administrative centre) by road.
