= Maly Amalat =

Maly Amalat Малый Амалат
- Settlement
- Location within Republic of Buryatia Location within Russia
- Coordinates: 54°17′N 113°26′E
- Country: Russia
- Region: Republic of Buryatia
- District: Bauntovsky District
- Time zone: UTC+8:00

Maly Amalat (Russian: Малый Амалат; Buryat: Бага Амалат, Baga Amalat) is a rural locality (a settlement) in Bauntovsky District, Republic of Buryatia, Russia. The population was 122 as of 2010. There are 5 streets.

== Geography ==
Maly Amalat is located 21 km southwest of Bagdarin (the district's administrative centre) by road, on the left bank of the Maly Amalat river, a tributary of the Amalat.
