= Mongoy =

Mongoy Монгой
- Settlement
- Location within Republic of Buryatia Location within Russia
- Coordinates: 53°58′N 113°49′E
- Country: Russia
- Region: Republic of Buryatia
- District: Bauntovsky District
- Time zone: UTC+8:00

Mongoy (Russian: Монгой) is a rural locality (a settlement) in Bauntovsky District, Republic of Buryatia, Russia. The population was 205 as of 2010. There are 8 streets.

== Geography ==
Mongoy is located by the Amalat river in the Vitim Plateau, 80 km southeast of Bagdarin (the district's administrative centre).
