= Malovsky =

Malovsky Маловский
- Settlement
- Location within Republic of Buryatia Location within Russia
- Coordinates: 54°23′N 113°32′E
- Country: Russia
- Region: Republic of Buryatia
- District: Bauntovsky District
- Time zone: UTC+8:00

Malovsky (Russian: Маловский) is a rural locality (a settlement) in Bauntovsky District, Republic of Buryatia, Russia. The population was 1,508 as of 2010. There are 28 streets.

== Geography ==
Malovsky is located in the Vitim Plateau, 8 kilometres (5.0 mi) south of Bagdarin (the district's administrative centre) by road.
