= Busani, Republic of Buryatia =

Busani Бусани
- Settlement
- Location within Republic of Buryatia Location within Russia
- Coordinates: 55°21′N 113°33′E
- Country: Russia
- Region: Republic of Buryatia
- District: Bauntovsky District
- Time zone: UTC+8:00

Busani (Russian: Бусани) is a rural locality (a settlement) in Bauntovsky District, Republic of Buryatia, Russia. The population was 35 as of 2010. There is 1 street.

== Geography ==
Busani is located by lake Busani and to the south of Uakit village, 97 km north of Bagdarin (the district's administrative centre) by road.
