= Kurort Baunt =

Kurort Baunt Курорт Баунт
- Settlement
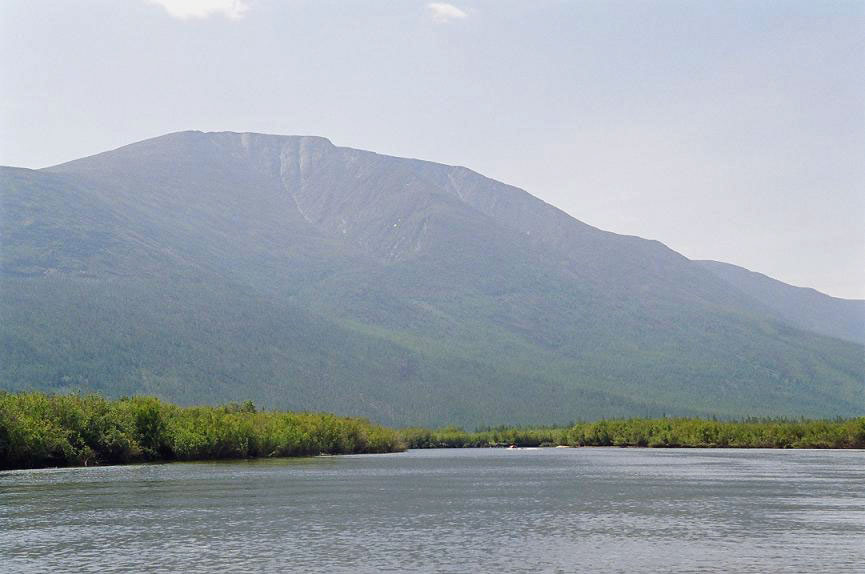
- Bolshoy Khanton mountain rising above the village

- Location within Republic of Buryatia Location within Russia
- Coordinates: 55°07′N 112°54′E
- Country: Russia
- Region: Republic of Buryatia
- District: Bauntovsky District
- Time zone: UTC+8:00

Kurort Baunt (Russian: Курорт Баунт) is a rural locality (a settlement) in Bauntovsky District, Republic of Buryatia, Russia. The population was 39 as of 2010. There are 7 streets.

== Geography ==
Kurort Baunt is located 113 km north of Bagdarin (the district's administrative centre) by road, on the right bank of the Upper Tsipa river. Lake Baunt and Kurort Baunt are located below the northeastern slopes of Bolshoy Khapton mountain.
