= Rossoshino =

Rossoshino Россошино
- Settlement
- Location within Republic of Buryatia Location within Russia
- Coordinates: 54°17′N 114°17′E
- Country: Russia
- Region: Republic of Buryatia
- District: Bauntovsky District
- Time zone: UTC+8:00

Rossoshino (Russian: Россошино) is a rural locality (a settlement) in Bauntovsky District, Republic of Buryatia, Russia. The population was 249 as of 2017. There are nine streets.

== Geography ==
Rossoshino is located in the Vitim Plateau, 125 km (78 mi) southeast of Bagdarin (the district's administrative centre) by road, by the Amalat river. Mongoy is the nearest rural locality.
