= Bambuyka =

River in southern East Siberia, Russia

Bambuyka Бамбуйка
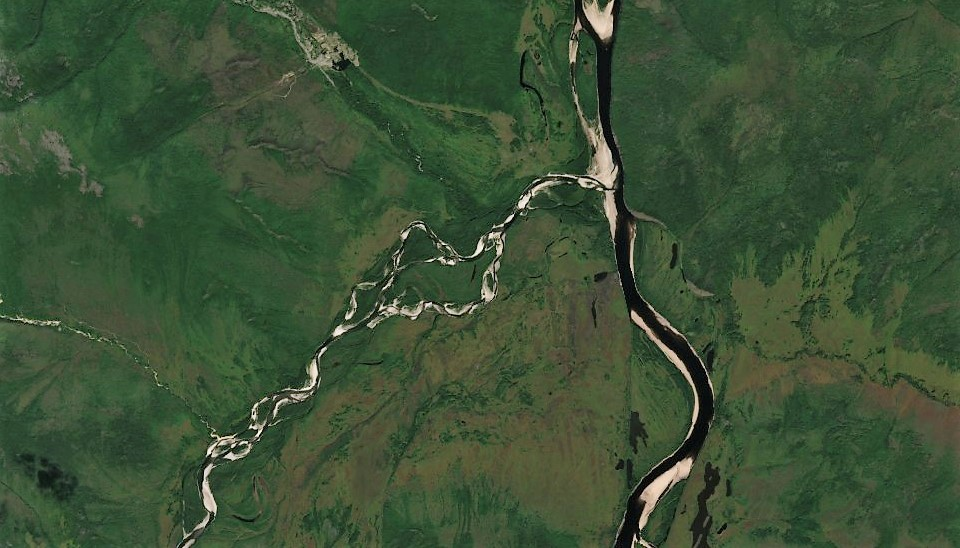
- Last stretch of the Bambuyka and its mouth in the Vitim Sentinel-2 image

- Mouth location in Buryatia, Russia

Location
- Country: Russia
- Federal subject: Buryatia

Physical characteristics
- Source: Southern Muya Range; South Siberian System
  - coordinates: 55°52′00″N 114°20′13″E
- Mouth: Vitim
  - coordinates: 55°46′58″N 115°49′43″E
- Length: 172 km (107 mi)
- Basin size: 4,170 km^{2} (1,610 sq mi)

Basin features
- Progression: Vitim→ Lena→ Laptev Sea

The Bambuyka (Russian: Бамбуйка) is a river in Buryatia, southern East Siberia, Russia. It is 172 kilometres (107 mi) long, and has a drainage basin of 4,170 square kilometres (1,610 sq mi).

The only inhabited place in the area is Bambuyka, Muysky District, a small hamlet located close to the mouth of the river.

== Course ==
The Bambuyka is a left tributary of the Vitim. Its sources are in a small lake close to the southwestern slope of Muisky Gigant, the highest peak of the Southern Muya Range. The river flows first in a SSE direction across mountainous terrain. It bends east close to the east of a sharp bend of the Tsipa and flows roughly in an eastward direction. Then it bends again and flows southeastwards. In its lower course it bends gradually, meandering northeastwards in a floodplain, until it finally meets the left bank of the Vitim 812 kilometres (505 mi) from its mouth in the Lena.

=== Tributaries ===
The longest tributaries of the Bambuyka are the 75 kilometres (47 mi) long Bambukoy on the left, as well as the 42 kilometres (26 mi) long Pashkov-Klyuch and the 55 kilometres (34 mi) long Golyube on the right.

== See also ==
- List of rivers of Russia
