= Varvarinsky =

Varvarinsky Варваринский
- Settlement
- Location within Republic of Buryatia Location within Russia
- Coordinates: 54°18′N 112°21′E
- Country: Russia
- Region: Republic of Buryatia
- District: Bauntovsky District
- Time zone: UTC+8:00

Varvarinsky (Russian: Варваринский) is a rural locality (a settlement) in Bauntovsky District, Republic of Buryatia, Russia. The population was 162 as of 2010. There are 3 streets.

== Geography ==
Varvarinsky is located 34 km west of Bagdarin (the district's administrative centre) by road.
