= Kapylyushi =

Body of fresh water in the Bauntovsky District, Buryatia, Russia

- Капылюши
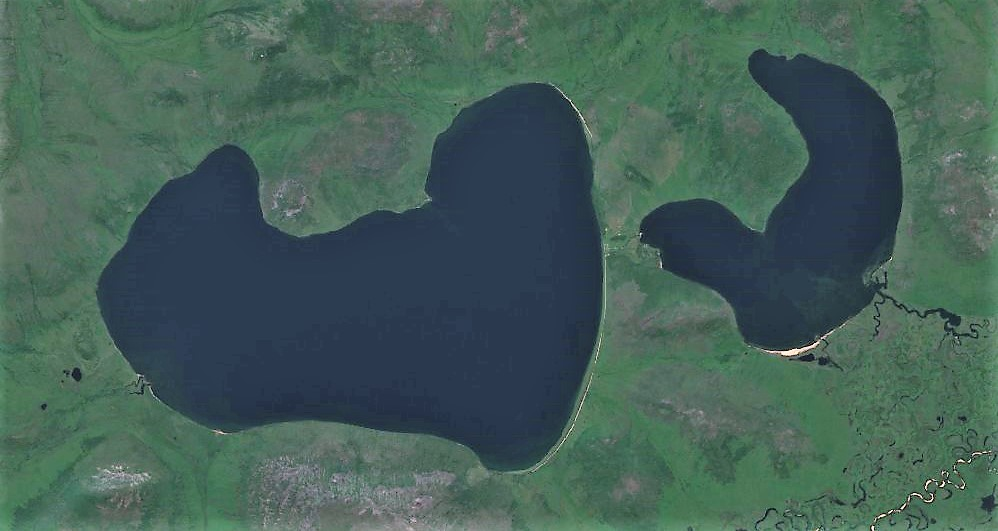
- Kapylyushi twin lakes Sentinel-2 image

- Location in Buryatia, Russian Far East
- Location: Vitim Plateau; South Siberian System
- Coordinates: 54°49′22″N 112°16′19″E
- Type: Mesotrophic
- Primary outflows: Tsipikan
- Catchment area: 291 km^{2} (112 sq mi)
- Basin countries: Buryatia, Russia
- Max. length: 11 km (6.8 mi)
- Max. width: 8.6 km (5.3 mi)
- Surface area: 63.6 km^{2} (24.6 sq mi)
- Average depth: 9.2 m (30 ft)
- Max. depth: 14.2 m (47 ft)
- Surface elevation: 1,175 m (3,855 ft)
- Frozen: October to June
- Islands: None
- Settlements: Okunevo

Kapylyushi (Russian: Капылюши) or Kapylyushy is a body of fresh water in the Bauntovsky District, Buryatia, Russia. The name originated in an Evenki word.

The lake is located in the northwestern corner of the Vitim Plateau, near the left bank of river Tsipikan, of the Vitim river basin. Together with lake Baunt it belongs to the "Tsipo-Tsipikansky" (Ципо-Ципиканских) lake group —after rivers Tsipa and Tsipikan, which is also known as Bauntovsky (Баунтовских) —after lake Baunt. The study of the whole lake area began only in the 1930s in the course of an expedition of the Krasnoyarsk branch of the Research Institute of Freshwater Fisheries of the USSR. The results of the research were published in 1936 in the Handbook of Water Resources of the USSR.

== Geography ==
The Kapylyushi lake system has two parts: Big Kapylyushi (Bolshoy Kapylyushi or Oron) is the larger lake in the west, and Kapyluchikan (Russian: Капылучикан), also known as Little Kapylyushi, the smaller one in the east. There is a narrow landspit between them as well as a channel connecting both lakes. A much smaller lake is located 4 km (2.5 mi) to the east of Kapyluchikan. To the south flows the Tsipikan river among marshes. In seasons of heavy rainfall the level of the Tsipikan rises and overflows its banks, reaching the lakes.

The Kapylyushi lakes are located below the eastern foothills of the Ikat Range, between the Bolshoy Khapton in the northeast and the Maly Khapton to the south. The village of Okunevo is located at the southern end of the landspit separating the two lakes.

The water of the lake is cold and barely warms in the summer. The Kapylyushi usually freezes at the end of October and stays under ice until the second half of June.

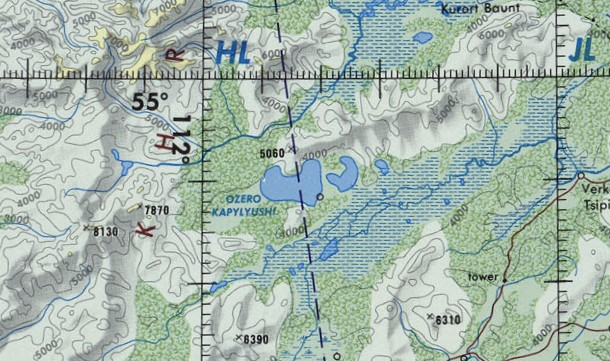
Kapylyushi lakes map section

== Flora and fauna ==
Aquatic plants such as Potamogeton, Myriophyllum and longroot smartweed grow in shallow areas of the lake system in the summer.

Amphipods, chironomid and caddis larvae, as well as crustaceans, gastropods, and bivalve molluscs inhabit the bottom of the lake. Fishing is an important industry, especially whitefish species, which include the Baunt whitefish Coregonus lavaretus (subspecies baunti), as well as a rare local spring-spawning whitefish variety. Other fish species living in the waters of the Kapylyushi are perch, pike, ruffe, burbot, spiny loach, lake minnow and Alpine bullhead.

== See also ==
- List of lakes of Russia
