= Mount Shaman =

Mountain in Russia

- гора Шаман
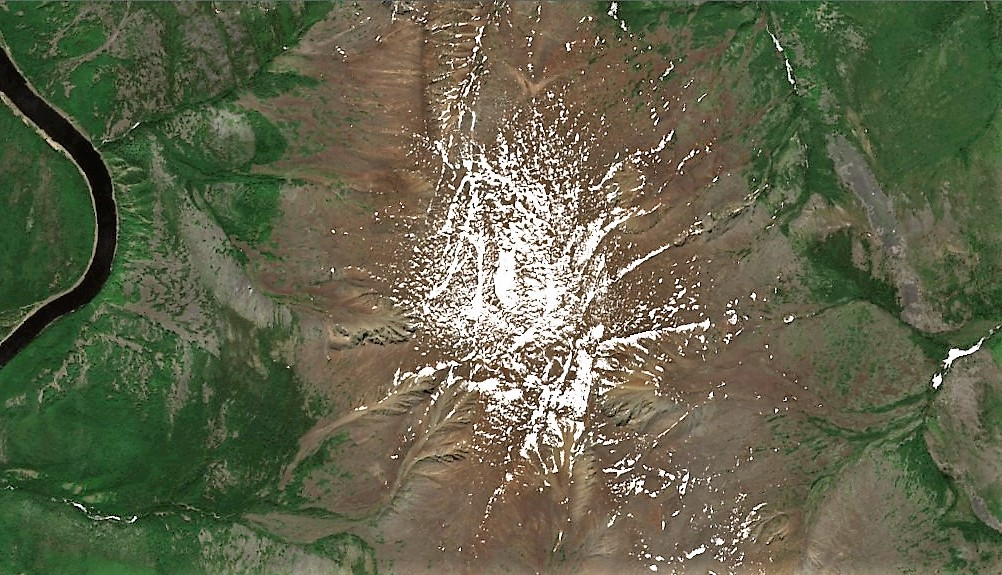
- Mt Shaman Sentinel-2 image

Highest point
- Elevation: 2,363 m (7,753 ft)
- Prominence: 1,597 m (5,240 ft)
- Listing: Ultra, Ribu
- Coordinates: 56°04′09″N 115°51′42″E

Geography
- Location within Zabaykalsky Krai
- Location: Zabaykalsky Krai, Russia
- Parent range: Southern Muya Range, Stanovoy Highlands, South Siberian System

Mount Shaman (Russian: гора Шаман) is a mountain in the Southern Muya Range, Stanovoy Highlands, Russia. Administratively it is located in the Zabaykalsky Krai of the Russian Far East.

At 2,363 m (7,753 ft) Mount Shaman is the highest peak of the Transbaikal side of the Southern Muya Range.

== See also ==
- List of mountains and hills of Russia
- List of ultras of Northeast Asia
- Muisky Gigant, the highest peak of the range on the Buryatia side
