= Ust-Dzhilinda =

Ust-Dzhilinda Усть-Джилинда
- Settlement
- Location within Republic of Buryatia Location within Russia
- Coordinates: 53°39′N 111°56′E
- Country: Russia
- Region: Republic of Buryatia
- District: Bauntovsky District
- Time zone: UTC+8:00
- Postal code: 671522

Ust-Dzhilinda (Russian: Усть-Джилинда) is a rural locality (a settlement) in Bauntovsky District, Republic of Buryatia, Russia. The population was 307 as of 2010. There are 9 streets.

== Geography ==
Ust-Dzhilinda is located 164 km southwest of Bagdarin (the district's administrative centre) by road. Its postal code is 671522.
