= Ulan-Burgas =

Mountain range in Buryatia, Russia

- Russian: Улан-Бургасы; Buryat: Улаан бургааhан
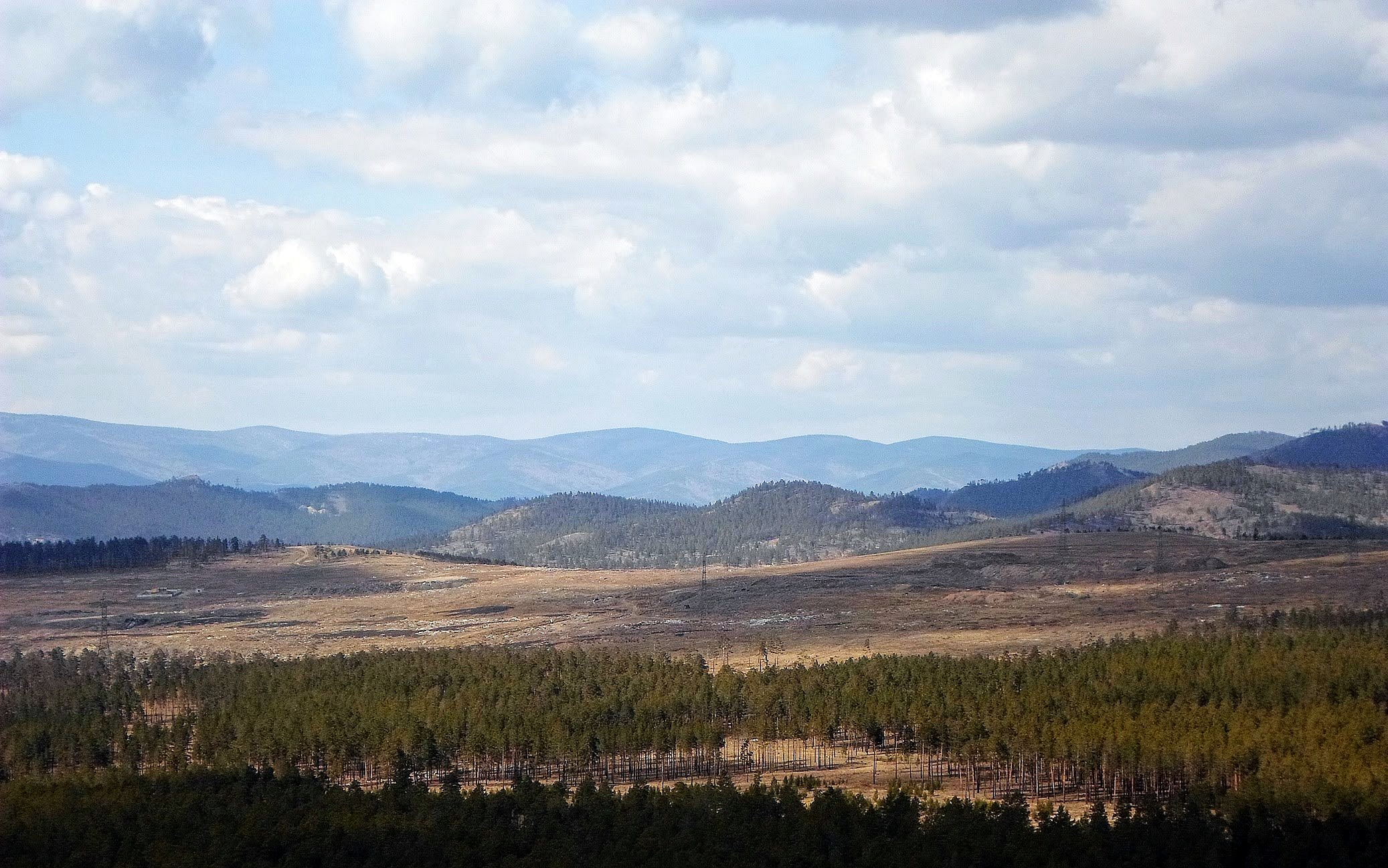
- Landscape of the Ulan-Burgas range from Mount Lysoy, Ulan-Ude

Highest point
- Peak: Khurkhag
- Elevation: 2,033 m (6,670 ft)

Dimensions
- Length: 200 km (120 mi) NE/SW
- Width: 50 km (31 mi) NW/SE

Geography
- Location within Republic of Buryatia
- Country: Russia
- Federal subject: Buryatia
- Range coordinates: 52°50′N 109°3′E
- Parent range: South Siberian System
- Borders on: Selenga Highlands

Geology
- Rock type: Metamorphic rock with granite intrusions

Climbing
- Easiest route: From Ulan-Ude

Ulan-Burgas (Russian: Улан-Бургасы; Buryat: Улаан бургааhан, from улаан - "red", and бургааһан, "small birch" or "shrub") is a mountain range in Buryatia, Russia.

The range is located close to Ulan-Ude, the capital of Buryatia.

== Geography ==
The Ulan-Burgas range is located in Central Buryatia. It rises east of the Baikal Lake, stretching for 200 kilometres (120 mi) from southwest to northeast between the valley of the Selenga River to the Vitim Plateau. The width of the range is from 30 kilometres (19 mi) and 50 kilometres (31 mi) and its average elevation is between 1,400 m (4,600 ft) and 1,800 m (5,900 ft). The highest peak is Khurkhag at 2,033 m (6,670 ft), located in the central part.

The northeastern end of the Ulan-Burgas connects with the Ikat Range and the eastern and southern ends are part of the Selenga Highlands. At one end of the range is the valley of the Turka River that flows into Lake Baikal and at the other end the Kurba, a right tributary of the Uda from the Selenga River basin.

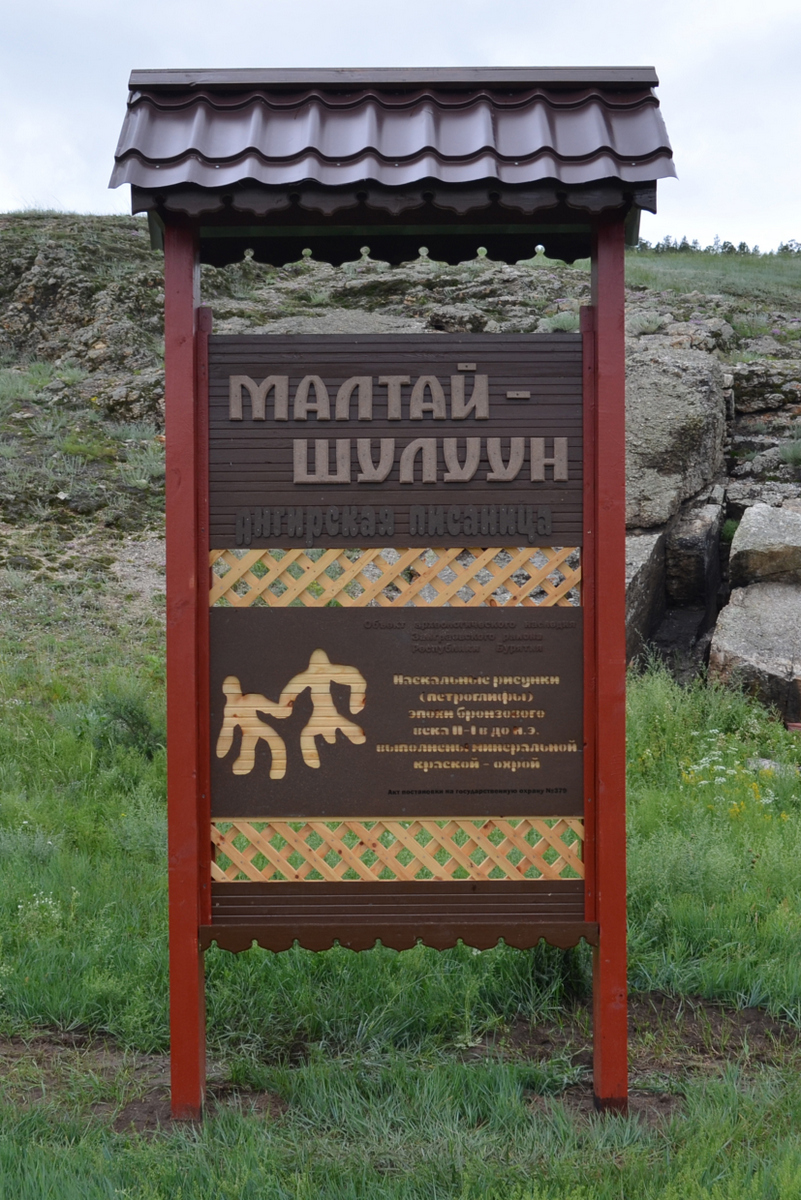
Maltai-Shulun Bronze Age petroglyphs, an archaeological site located at the feet of the Ulan-Burgas Range

== Flora ==
The slopes of the range are mainly covered with Alpine-steppe vegetation from the foot of the mountains to an elevation between 700 m (2,300 ft) and 800 m (2,600 ft), above which in most of the parts of the range there is a larch taiga forest belt up to about 1,600 m (5,200 ft). The higher elevations are topped by "golets" type bare summits.

== See also ==
- South Siberian Mountains
