= Romanovka, Republic of Buryatia =

Romanovka Романовка
- Selo
- Location within Republic of Buryatia Location within Russia
- Coordinates: 53°13′N 112°46′E
- Country: Russia
- Region: Republic of Buryatia
- District: Bauntovsky District
- Elevation: 870 m (2,850 ft)
- Time zone: UTC+8:00

Romanovka (Russian: Романовка) is a rural locality (a selo) and the administrative centre of Vitimskoye Rural Settlement, Bauntovsky District, Republic of Buryatia, Russia. The population was 1,198 as of 2017. There are 17 streets.

== Geography ==
Romanovka is located in the Vitim Plateau, 171 km south of Bagdarin (the district's administrative centre) by road. The P436 regional road connecting Ulan-Ude and Chita passes through Romanovka across the plateau. Road P437 connecting Romanovka and Bagdarin begins in the town.

== Climate ==
Climate data for Romanovka (extremes 1936-present)
Month	Jan	Feb	Mar	Apr	May	Jun	Jul	Aug	Sep	Oct	Nov	Dec	Year
Record high °C (°F)	−0.8 (30.6)	5.2 (41.4)	18.0 (64.4)	26.5 (79.7)	32.2 (90.0)	35.3 (95.5)	35.9 (96.6)	34.2 (93.6)	28.7 (83.7)	23.6 (74.5)	10.0 (50.0)	2.0 (35.6)	35.9 (96.6)
Mean daily maximum °C (°F)	−18.2 (−0.8)	−10.8 (12.6)	−2.3 (27.9)	7.0 (44.6)	15.7 (60.3)	22.6 (72.7)	24.5 (76.1)	21.6 (70.9)	14.7 (58.5)	4.8 (40.6)	−8.0 (17.6)	−17.5 (0.5)	4.5 (40.1)
Daily mean °C (°F)	−26.0 (−14.8)	−20.2 (−4.4)	−11.3 (11.7)	−0.5 (31.1)	7.5 (45.5)	14.3 (57.7)	16.8 (62.2)	14.0 (57.2)	6.6 (43.9)	−2.7 (27.1)	−15.4 (4.3)	−24.3 (−11.7)	−3.4 (25.8)
Mean daily minimum °C (°F)	−32.8 (−27.0)	−29.2 (−20.6)	−21.1 (−6.0)	−8.5 (16.7)	−1.0 (30.2)	5.7 (42.3)	9.5 (49.1)	7.2 (45.0)	−0.4 (31.3)	−9.5 (14.9)	−22.0 (−7.6)	−30.2 (−22.4)	−11.0 (12.2)
Record low °C (°F)	−54.5 (−66.1)	−52.3 (−62.1)	−45.8 (−50.4)	−32.6 (−26.7)	−16.8 (1.8)	−7.4 (18.7)	−3.4 (25.9)	−7.1 (19.2)	−18.8 (−1.8)	−35.3 (−31.5)	−45.0 (−49.0)	−49.2 (−56.6)	−54.5 (−66.1)
Average precipitation mm (inches)	3.1 (0.12)	1.9 (0.07)	4.2 (0.17)	14.5 (0.57)	33.4 (1.31)	51.8 (2.04)	91.6 (3.61)	85.0 (3.35)	45.7 (1.80)	9.4 (0.37)	7.1 (0.28)	4.6 (0.18)	352.3 (13.87)
Source: pogoda.ru.net
