= Ikat Range =

Mountain range in Buryatia, Russia

- Russian: Икатский хребет
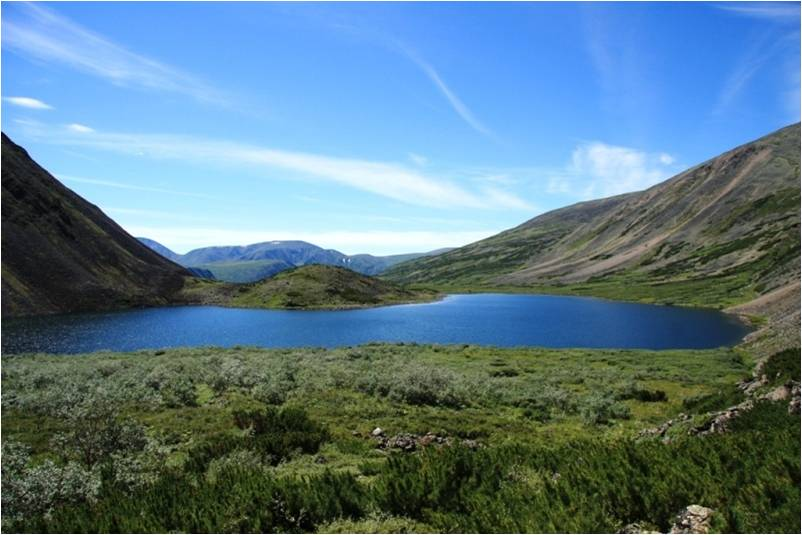
- Ikat Bowl mountain lake in the range, a traditional sacred place for the Evenks.

Highest point
- Peak: Unnamed
- Elevation: 2,574 m (8,445 ft)
- Coordinates: 55°01′53″N 111°50′04″E

Dimensions
- Length: 200 km (120 mi) NE/SW
- Width: 50 km (31 mi) NW/SE

Geography
- Location within Republic of Buryatia
- Country: Russia
- Federal subject: Buryatia
- Range coordinates: 53°36′N 111°0′E
- Parent range: South Siberian System
- Borders on: Selenga Highlands; Vitim Plateau

Geology
- Rock type: Metamorphic schists with granite intrusions

Climbing
- Easiest route: From Kurumkan Airport

Ikat Range (Russian: Икатский хребет) is a mountain range in Buryatia, Russia. It runs in a parallel direction to the Baikal Rift. The range is named after two small rivers sharing the name "Ikat" which have their sources in opposite slopes of the range one is a tributary of the Gargi (Barguzin basin) and the other a tributary of the Vitimkan (Vitim basin).

The name of the range originated in an Evenki word. A section of the northwestern slopes of the range is part of the Dzherginsky Nature Reserve, a protected area.

== Geography ==
The Ikat range is located in Central Buryatia, east of the Baikal Lake. It stretches for 200 kilometres (120 mi) from southwest to northeast at the western limit of the Vitim Plateau. The width of the range is from 40 kilometres (25 mi) and 50 kilometres (31 mi) and its average elevation between 1,800 m (5,900 ft) and 2,000 m (6,600 ft). The highest peak is an unnamed 2,574 m (8,445 ft) high summit located in the central part found during a 1980 aerial survey. Previously, 2,538 m (8,327 ft) high Dorong Peak, located at the headwaters of the Kotera, to the west of lake Dorong had been considered the highest point of the Ikat Range.

The range is a watershed between the Barguzin River and the Vitim river. The Barguzin river separates the Ikat Range from the Barguzin Range in the west, while the Turka valley separates it from the Ulan-Burgas and the Selenga Highlands to the south. Beyond the northern end lies the valley of the Upper Angara River and the Southern Muya Range of the Stanovoy Highlands rises to the northeast. To the southwest the valley of the upper Ina River separates the Ikat range from the Golondin Range.

Lakes Baunt and Kapylyushi lie off the eastern slopes of the northern section of the range. The Barguzin and several of its left tributaries, have their sources in the western slopes of range. On the eastern side rise the Tsipa, Tsipikan and the upper course tributaries of the Vitim river, which receives the name "Vitim" below the confluence of rivers Vitimkan and China.

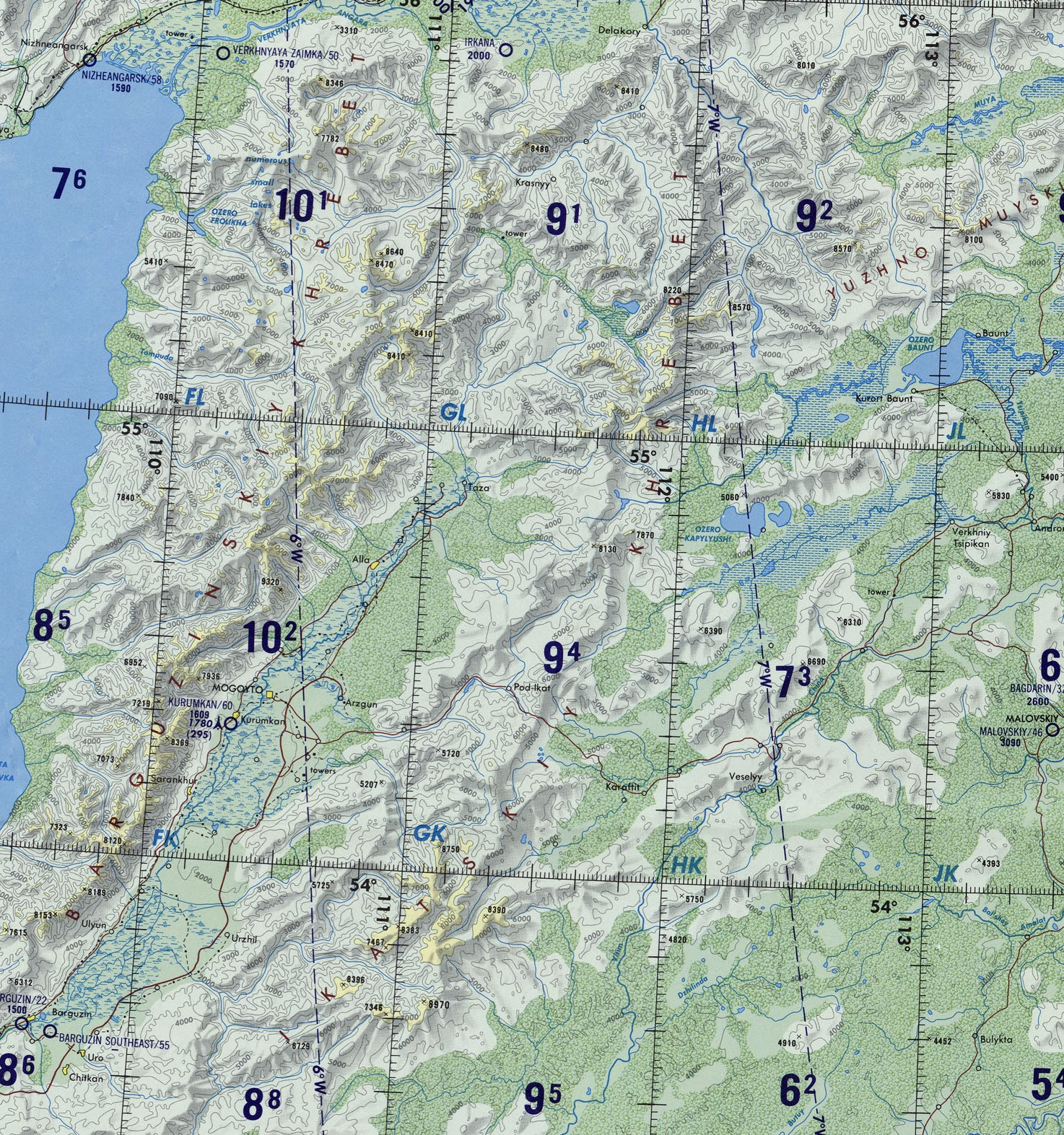
Ikat Range in the center of the map section.

== Flora ==
The lower slopes of the range are mainly covered with forest steppe from the foot of the mountains to an elevation between 800 m (2,600 ft) and 900 m (3,000 ft) on the western slopes. At higher elevations there is larch taiga up to about 1,200 m (3,900 ft) in the northern slopes. The highest parts of the range are topped by thickets of dwarf cedar and mountain tundra vegetation.

== See also ==
- List of mountains and hills of Russia
- South Siberian Mountains
