= Baunt =

Lake in Buryatia, Russia

- Баунт / Баунт нуур
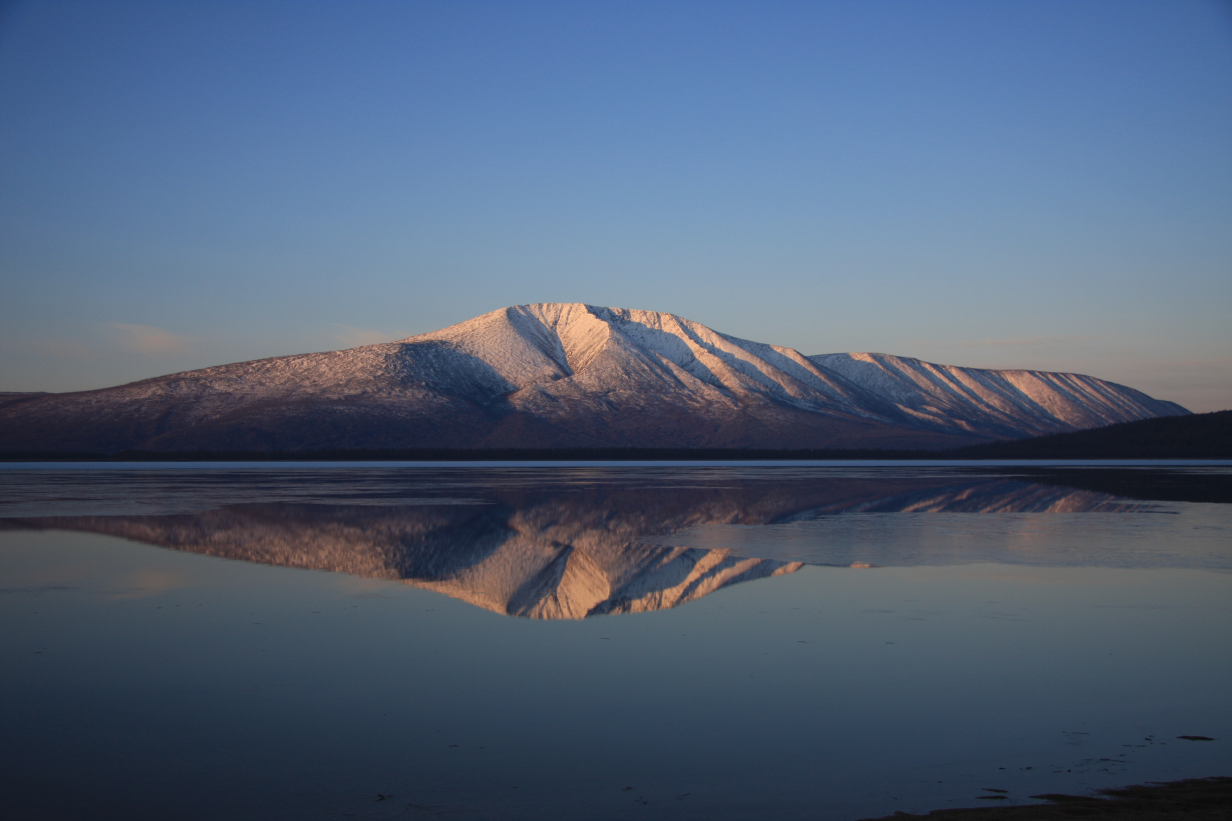
- Mt Bolshoy Khapton rising above the lakeshore

- Location in Buryatia, Russian Far East
- Location: Baunt Basin; South Siberian System
- Coordinates: 55°10′54″N 113°0′36″E
- Primary inflows: Upper Tsipa, Kinavka, Tsipikan
- Primary outflows: Tsipa
- Catchment area: 10,300 km^{2} (4,000 sq mi)
- Basin countries: Buryatia, Russia
- Max. length: 16.3 km (10.1 mi)
- Max. width: 9 km (5.6 mi)
- Surface area: 111 km^{2} (43 sq mi)
- Average depth: 17 m (56 ft)
- Max. depth: 33 m (108 ft)
- Shore length^{1}: 55 km (34 mi)
- Surface elevation: 1,060 m (3,478 ft)
- Frozen: October to May
- Settlements: Kurort Baunt, Baunt
- ^{1} Shore length is not a well-defined measure.

Baunt (Russian: Баунт; Russian Buryat: Баунт нуур, Baunt nuur) is the name of a body of fresh water in the Bauntovsky District, Buryatia, Russia.

The village of Kurort Baunt, where there are some hot springs, is located on the southwestern shore of the lake, at the foot of Mt Bolshoy Khapton, near the confluence of the Upper Tsipa, and the village of Baunt is on the northeastern shore. At a headland named Cape Tryokhstanka there are ancient petroglyphs. The lake is a protected area since 1988. Its environment provides a habitat for a number of fish and bird species, as well as the crustacean Asellus aquaticus.

== Geography ==
The lake has a roughly triangular shape. It stretches in a southwest-northeast direction parallel to the main ridge of the Southern Muya Range to the north and the Baunt Basin, with the Maly Khapton and Babanty Range, two ranges of the Vitim Plateau, to the south. The Ikat Range rises to the west and the Kapylyushi lakes lie to the southwest. The Upper Tsipa enters the lake at the SW shore through two arms. The Tsipikan flows from the east into the lake and further to the east lies lake Busani. The lower Tsipa river flows out of the lake from the northeast.

The northwestern shore, as well as part of the southern shore of the lake, is abrupt and rocky with up to 1,400 meters (4,600 ft) high mountains towering above it. On the other hand, the shores to the southwest and east are low and marshy, with many small lakes and bogs. The lake freezes between late October or early November to May or early June. The ice in the central area may reach a thickness of 1.9 m (6.2 ft).

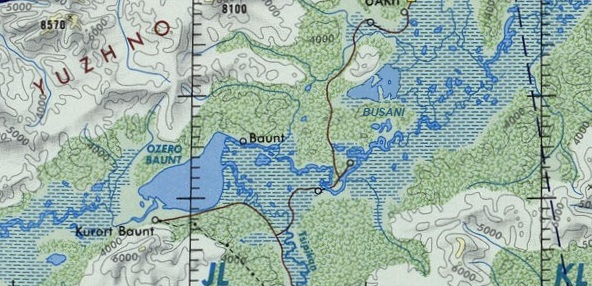
Lakes Baunt and Busani map section.

== See also ==
- List of lakes of Russia
