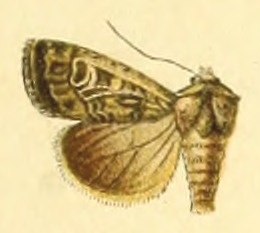

Scientific classification
- Domain: Eukaryota
- Kingdom: Animalia
- Phylum: Arthropoda
- Class: Insecta
- Order: Lepidoptera
- Superfamily: Noctuoidea
- Family: Noctuidae
- Genus: Euxoa
- Species: E. fissa

Binomial name
- Euxoa fissa Staudinger, 1895

= Euxoa fissa =

Species of moth

Euxoa fissa is a moth of the family Noctuidae. It is found in Siberia (the West Siberian Plain and the South Siberian Mountains), Armenia, Kyrgyzstan and Mongolia.
