= Muisky Gigant =

Mountain in Russia

- Муйский Гигант
- Location within Republic of Buryatia

Highest point
- Elevation: 3,067 m (10,062 ft)
- Prominence: 2107
- Coordinates: 55°58′38″N 114°26′21″E

Geography
- Location: Buryatia, Russia
- Parent range: Southern Muya Range, Stanovoy Highlands, South Siberian System

Climbing
- First ascent: 8 July 1993
- Easiest route: From Taksimo Airport

Muisky Gigant (Russian: Муйский Гигант) is a mountain in the Southern Muya Range, Stanovoy Highlands, Russia. Administratively it is located in Buryatia, Russian Federation.

Following four failed attempts to climb the peak, the first ascent of Muysky Gigant, took place on 8 July 1993, by a group of students of the Novosibirsk Institute of Railway Engineers led by alpinist and tour organizer Alexander Kuzminykh.

== Geography ==
Muisky Gigant is a massive-looking mountain, an ultra-prominent peak, rising about 45 kilometres (28 mi) southwest of Taksimo, the administrative center of Muysky District.

At 3,067 m (10,062 ft) this mountain is the highest peak of the Southern Muya Range. Muisky Gigant rises from a massif that constitutes a short spur of the main axis of the range. The Bambukoy River, a left tributary of the Bambuyka of the Vitim river basin, has its sources in the southeastern slopes of the mountain.

== See also ==
- List of mountains and hills of Russia
- List of ultras of Northeast Asia
- Mount Shaman, the highest peak of the range on the Transbaikalia side
