= Uakit =

Uakit Уакит
- Settlement
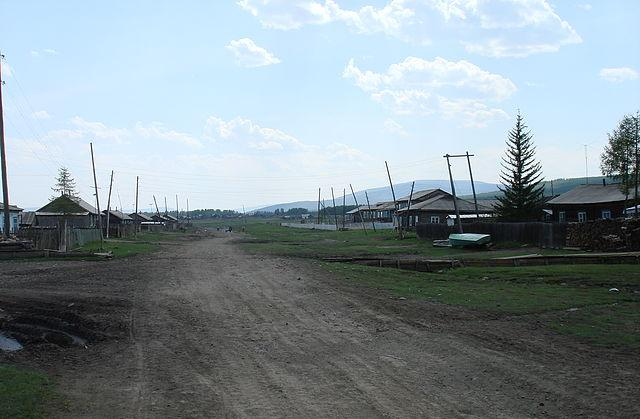

- Location within Republic of Buryatia Location within Russia
- Coordinates: 55°28′N 113°38′E
- Country: Russia
- Region: Republic of Buryatia
- District: Bauntovsky District
- Time zone: UTC+8:00

Uakit (Russian: Уакит) is a rural locality (a settlement) in Bauntovsky District, Republic of Buryatia, Russia. The population was 415 as of 2010. The locality has 13 streets.

== Geography ==
Uakit is located in the area of lake Busani, 97 km north of Bagdarin (the district's administrative centre) by road.
