= Dorong =

Body of fresh water in the Bauntovsky District, Buryatia, Russia

- Доронг
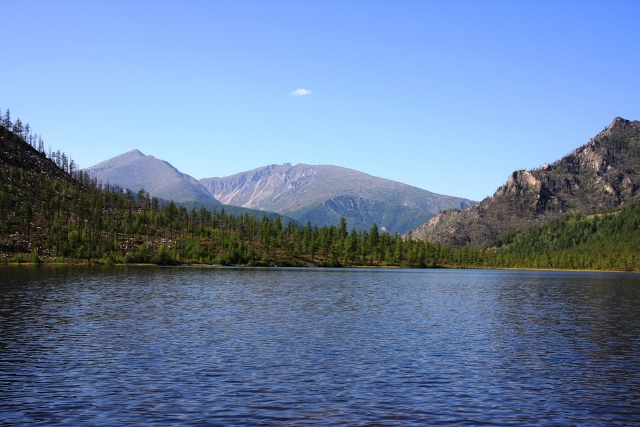
- View of lake Dorong.

- Location in Buryatia, Russian Far East
- Location: Southern Muya Range; South Siberian System
- Coordinates: 55°17′30″N 112°16′16″E
- Primary inflows: Tocha
- Primary outflows: Tocha
- Catchment area: 241 km^{2} (93 sq mi)
- Basin countries: Buryatia, Russia
- Max. length: 8.5 km (5.3 mi)
- Max. width: 1 km (0.62 mi)
- Surface area: 6 km^{2} (2.3 sq mi)
- Max. depth: 55 m (180 ft)
- Surface elevation: 1,110 m (3,642 ft)
- Islands: None

Dorong (Russian: Доронг) is a body of fresh water in the Bauntovsky District, Buryatia, Russia. The name originated in an Evenki word.

Dorong is a natural monument of Russia because of its landscapes. The valley of the lake acts as a corridor and is usually very windy.

== Geography ==
The lake is located at the southwestern corner of the Southern Muya Range, near where it merges with the Ikat Range. It is a deep and elongated lake, bound by steep mountains on both sides. The Dorong stretches roughly from north to south for 8.5 km (5.3 mi) and has a width of about 1 km (0.62 mi) which remains fairly constant along the length of the lake. The Tocha river, belonging to the Tsipa basin, enters the lake from the north and flows out of it from the south.

== Fauna ==
Whitefish species are common in the waters of the lake.

== See also ==
- List of lakes of Russia
