= Ivolga =

Ivolga (Russian: иволга) means golden oriole in Russian and may refer to

- Ivolga archaeological site in Buryatia, Russia
- Ivolga monastery in Buryatia, Russia
- Ivolga - an electric multiple unit passenger train of TVZ
