= Baunt, Republic of Buryatia =

Baunt Баунт
- Settlement
- Location within Republic of Buryatia Location within Russia
- Coordinates: 55°15′N 113°07′E
- Country: Russia
- Region: Republic of Buryatia
- District: Bauntovsky District
- Time zone: UTC+8:00

Baunt (Russian: Баунт) is a rural locality (a settlement) in Bauntovsky District, Republic of Buryatia, Russia. The population was 33 as of 2010. There are 4 streets.

== Geography ==
Baunt is located 106 km north of Bagdarin (the district's administrative centre) by road.
