= Selenga Highlands =

Mountain area in Buryatia, Russia

- Селенгинское среднегорье
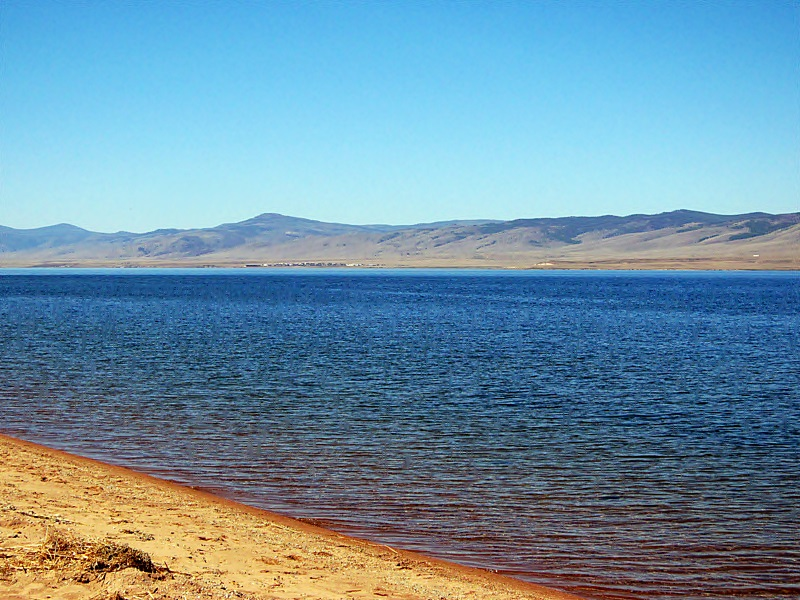
- View of the Khambin Range from the eastern shore of Lake Gusinoye

Highest point
- Peak: Burgutuy Range HP
- Elevation: 2,000 m (6,600 ft)

Dimensions
- Length: 350 km (220 mi) NE/SW
- Width: 140 km (87 mi) NW/SE
- Area: 60,000 km^{2} (23,000 mi^{2})

Geography
- Location within Republic of Buryatia
- Country: Russia
- Federal subjects: Buryatia and Transbaikal Krai
- Range coordinates: 51°N 107°E
- Parent range: South Siberian System
- Borders on: Mongolia

Geology
- Rock ages: Paleozoic and Permian

The Selenga Highlands (Russian: Селенгинское среднегорье) are a mountainous area in Buryatia and the southwestern end of Zabaykalsky Krai, Russia.

The Highlands are named after the Selenga River. Protected areas in the Highlands include the Baikal Nature Reserve and the Altacheysky Reserve.

== Geography ==
The Selenga Highlands are located in central and southern Buryatia. They rise in the area of the basin of the Selenga River, including its large tributaries – Dzhida, Temnik River, Chikoy, Khilok and Uda. From the north, the highlands are edged by the valleys of the Khamar-Daban and Ulan-Burgas ranges; in the east they are bound by the watershed of the Uda, Vitim and Shilka, bordering on the Vitim Plateau. In the southeast they adjoin the Khentei-Daur Highlands and to the south lies the Mongolia–Russia border. In the southwest and west, the Highlands are bounded by the northern slopes of the Dzhidinsky Range and the southwestern slopes of the Lesser Khamar-Daban. Lake Gusinoye is located in a basin between two ranges of the highlands.

=== Subranges ===
The Selenga Highlands include low to middle height mountain ranges with elevations ranging from 800 metres (2,600 ft) to 2,000 metres (6,600 ft) above sea level, generally oriented in a northeast and ENE direction.

- Borgoy Range, highest point 1,240 metres (4,070 ft)
- Burgutuy Range, highest point 2,000 metres (6,600 ft)
- Zagan Range, highest point 1,382 metres (4,534 ft)
- Western Malkhan Range, highest point 1,741 metres (5,712 ft)
- Monostoy Range, highest point 1,173 metres (3,848 ft)
- Khambin Range, highest point 1,420 metres (4,660 ft)
- Khudan Range, highest point 1,327 metres (4,354 ft)
- Tsagan-Daban, highest point 1,431 metres (4,695 ft)
- Lesser Khamar-Daban (southern slopes only)
- Ulan-Burgas (eastern and southern slopes only)
- Smaller ranges, such as Ganzurin Range, Shaman Mountains and Toyon among others.

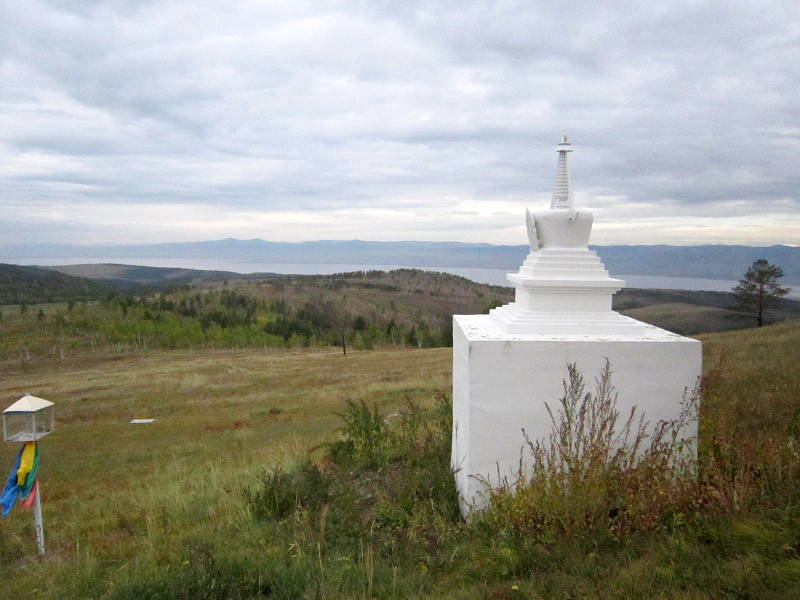
A stupa in the slopes of the Monostoy Range

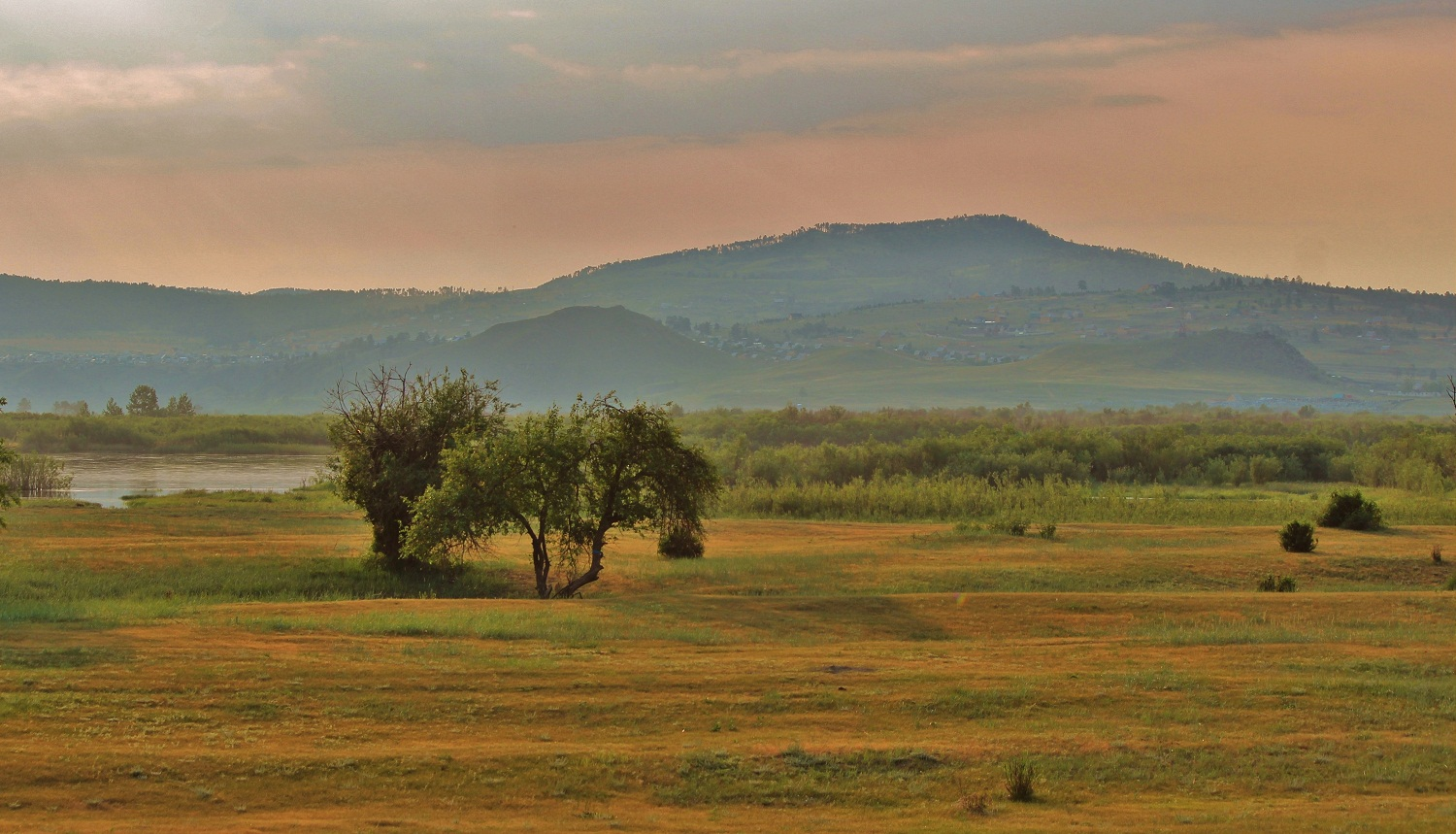
View of the Ivolga archaeological site

=== Intermontane basins ===
In the Selenga Highlands some areas between ranges are occupied by significant depressions. These include:

- Bichur Depression, with a length of 150 kilometres (93 mi) and a width of 20 kilometres (12 mi)
- Gusinoozyor Basin, with a length of 50 kilometres (31 mi) and a width of 12 kilometres (7.5 mi)
- Tugnuy-Sukhara Depression, with a length of 140 kilometres (87 mi) and a width of 30 kilometres (19 mi)
- Other important intermontane basins are Borgoy, Ubukun-Orongoy, Udin-Ivolgin and Khudan-Kizhingin, among others.

== Flora and climate ==
The Selenga Highlands include taiga, steppe and forest steppe areas. Soils at heights from 500 metres (1,600 ft) to 700 metres (2,300 ft) are brown, from 700 metres (2,300 ft) to 900 metres (3,000 ft) black, and from 800 metres (2,600 ft) to 1,000 metres (3,300 ft) alfisols. Roughly two-thirds of the highlands are covered by mainly coniferous forests, but large areas of birch forests are also found. Of the rare plant species, the Siberian apricot, listed in the Red Book of Buryatia, deserves mention.

The climate of the Highlands area is harshly continental. The average annual temperature is −0.5 °C (31.1 °F). Annual precipitation in the middle reaches of the Selenga River is between 210 millimetres (8.3 in) and 250 millimetres (9.8 in). Further up the watershed of the river's tributaries it reaches 350 millimetres (14 in).

== Bibliography ==
- Natalʹi︠a︡ Vasilʹevna Fadeeva, Селенгинское среднегорье: природные условия и районирование (Selenga Highlands: Natural Conditions and Zoning) Buryat Book Publishing House, 1963 – Physical geography – 169 pages, (in Russian)
- S. Baja, E. Danzhalova, Yu. Drobyshev, Трансформация наземных экосистем южной части бассейна Байкала (Transformation of terrestrial ecosystems in the southern part of the Baikal basin). 2018, (in Russian)

== See also ==
- Transbaikal
