= Bolshoy Khapton =

Mountain Range in Bauntovsky, Russia

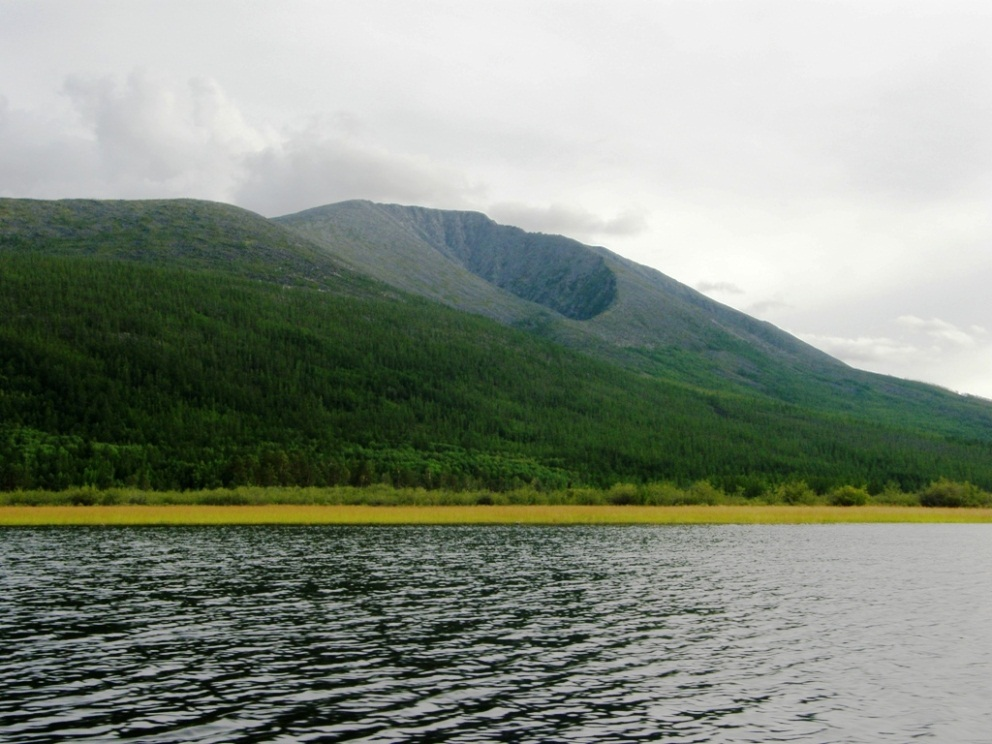
- View of the Bolshoy Khapton.

Highest point
- Peak: Mt Bolshoy Khapton
- Elevation: 2,284 m (7,493 ft)
- Coordinates: 55°05′25″N 112°52′25″E

Dimensions
- Length: 50 km (31 mi) NE-SW
- Width: 10 km (6.2 mi)

Geography
- Location within Republic of Buryatia
- Country: Russia
- Federal subject: Buryatia
- Range coordinates: 55°0′N 112°43′E
- Parent range: Vitim Plateau; South Siberian System

Climbing
- Easiest route: From Bagdarin

The Bolshoy Khapton (Russian: Большой Хаптон) is a mountain range in Bauntovsky District, Buryatia, Russia.

The nearest airport is Bagdarin Airport.

== Geography ==
This mountain range is located in the northeastern part of the Vitim Plateau. It stretches from southwest to northeast for almost 50 km between the Kapylyushi lake group and the southern shores of Baunt lake. The Bolshoy Khapton range is part of the watershed of the Tsipikan and Upper Tsipa rivers. In its eastern section it reaches a maximum width of 10 km. The highest point of the range is 2,284 m (7,493 ft) high Mt Bolshoy Khapton.

20 km (12 mi) to the south, across the Tsipikan River, rises the smaller Maly Khapton range, highest point 2,135 m (7,005 ft). It runs parallel to the Bolshoy Khapton at the southern limit of the Baunt Depression.

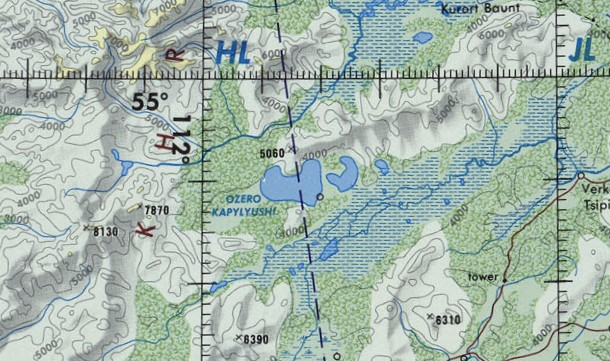
Kapylyushi lakes and Bolshoy Khapton.

== See also ==
- List of mountains and hills of Russia
