= Stanovoy Highlands =

Mountain range in Russia

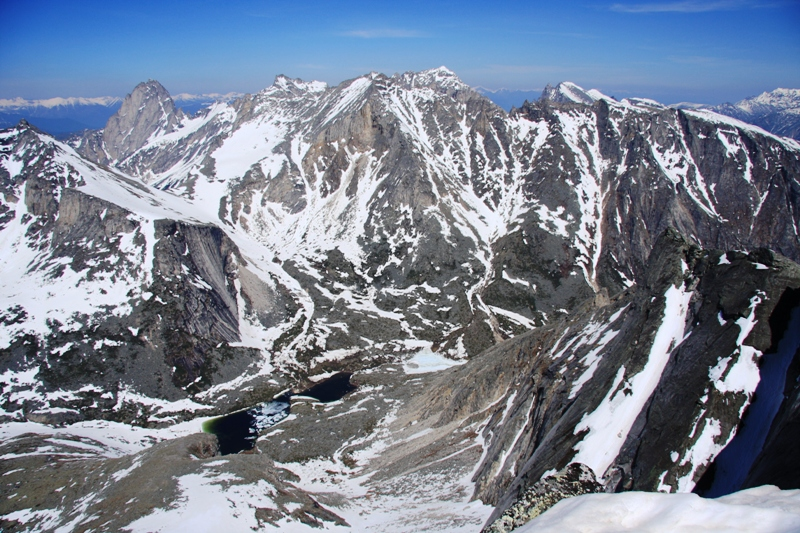
- View of the Southern Muya, one of the subranges of the highlands with the highest altitudes.

Highest point
- Peak: Pik BAM
- Elevation: 3,072 m (10,079 ft)
- Coordinates: 56°51′54.85″N 117°34′47.32″E

Dimensions
- Length: 700 km (430 mi) ENE-WSW

Geography
- Location within Russia Location within Republic of Buryatia
- Country: Russia
- Federal subject: Buryatia
- Range coordinates: 56°5′0″N 114°30′0″E
- Parent range: South Siberian Mountains

The Stanovoy Highlands (Russian: Станово́е наго́рье) or Stanovoy Uplands is a mountain range in the Transbaikal region of Siberia, Russia.

== Geography ==
The Stanovoy Highlands are a mountainous area between the Patom Highlands to the north and the Vitim Plateau to the south. To the northeast they border with the Olyokma-Chara Plateau —in the upper reaches of the Chara river. The ranges of the highlands stretch roughly in a WSW / ENE direction between the North Baikal Highlands in the west and the Olyokma River in the east. The latter separates it from the Stanovoy Range in the east. There are large intermontane basins, such as the Muya Depression and the Chara Depression at altitudes ranging between 500 m (1,600 ft) and 1,000 m (3,300 ft).

=== Subranges ===
The system of the Stanovoy Highlands comprises a group of subranges, including the following:

- Southern Muya Range (Южно-Муйский хребет), highest point Muisky Gigant, 3,067 metres (10,062 ft)
- Northern Muya Range (Северо-Муйский хребет), highest point 2,537 metres (8,323 ft)
- Kodar Range (Кодар), highest point Pik BAM, 3,072 metres (10,079 ft)
- Udokan Range (Удокан), highest point 2,561 metres (8,402 ft)
- Kalar Range, highest point Skalisty Golets, 2,519 metres (8,264 ft)
- Delyun-Uran Range (Делюн-Уранский Хребет), highest point 2,399 metres (7,871 ft)

=== Hydrography ===
The Stanovoy mountain system is cut across from south to north by the deep valley of river Vitim, a right tributary of the Lena. Many left (Muya, Mamakan, Mama, Bolshoy Chuya) and right (Kalakan, Kalar, Konda, Sigikta) tributaries of the Vitim originate from its ranges. Likewise for some of the left tributaries of the Olyokma, such as the Diri-Yurya, Imangra, Khani, Oryus-Miele and the Chara with the Tokko.

Rivers Upper Angara, flowing into Lake Baikal, and Chaya, a right tributary of the Lena, have their sources in the western parts of the mountain system. There are also mountain lakes in the range, such as Dorong.

== See also ==
- List of mountains and hills of Russia
- Joseph Martin (explorer)
