= Bambuyka, Republic of Buryatia =

Bambuyka Бамбуйка
- Settlement
- Location within Republic of Buryatia Location within Russia
- Coordinates: 55°47′N 115°48′E
- Country: Russia
- Region: Republic of Buryatia
- District: Muysky District
- Time zone: UTC+8:00

Bambuyka (Russian: Бамбуйка) is a rural locality (a settlement) in Muysky District, Republic of Buryatia, Russia. The population was 7 as of 2010.

== Geography ==
Bambuyka is located 77 km southeast of Taksimo (the district's administrative centre) by road.
