= Ivolga archaeological site =

Site in Buryatia, Russia

Coordinates: 51.7507°N 109.1442°E

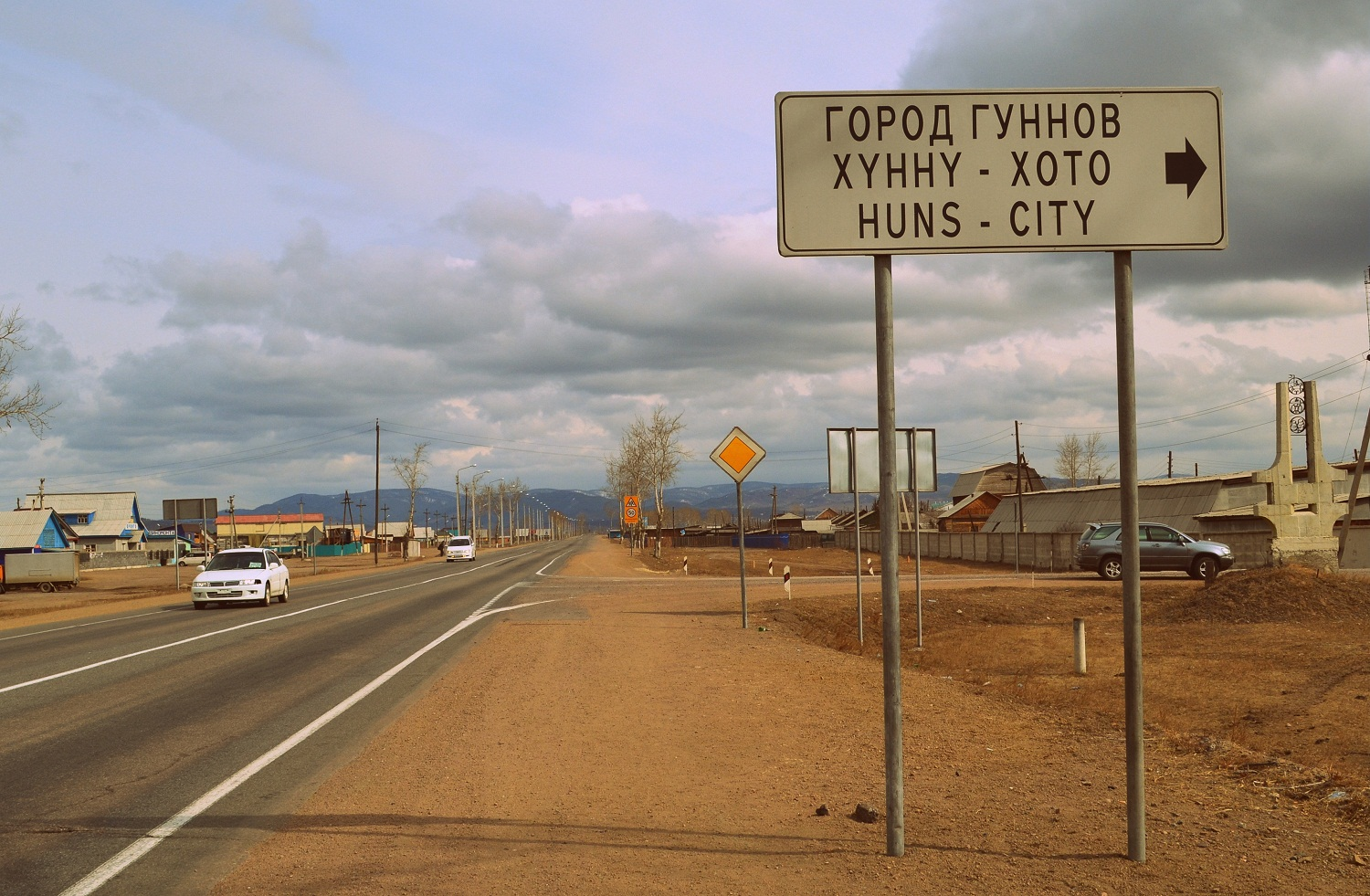
Entry to the Ivolga archaeological site. The Buryat line of the road sign translates “Xiongnu city”.

The Ivolga (Xiongnu) archaeological site (Russian Иволгинское (Хуннское) городище Ivolginskoye (Hunnskoe) gorodishche) is the place of a fortified city of the Xiongnu which was founded in the 3rd century BC and destroyed in the 1st century BC. It is sited in the Selenga Highlands near Ulan-Ude, the capital of the Republic of Buryatia, Russia. It is part of the folklore of this city where the Xiongnu are mixed up with the Huns.
