= Tsipikan (river) =

River in Buryatia, Russia

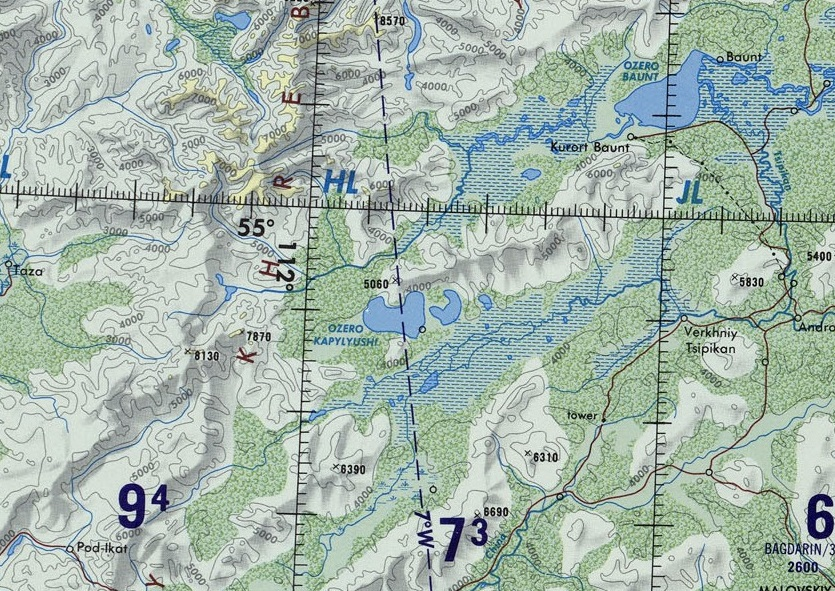
- Course of the Tsipikan

- Mouth location in Buryatia, Russia

Location
- Country: Russia

Physical characteristics
- Source: Ikat Range
  - coordinates: 54°46′44″N 111°50′0″E
  - elevation: 2,107 m (6,913 ft)
- Mouth: Tsipa
  - location: Baunt
  - coordinates: 55°12′55″N 113°05′13″E
  - elevation: 1,059 m (3,474 ft)
- Length: 329 km (204 mi)
- Basin size: 6,710 km^{2} (2,590 sq mi)
- Discharge
  - average: 36.8 m^{3}/s (1,300 cu ft/s)

Basin features
- Progression: Tsipa→Vitim→ Lena→ Laptev Sea

The Tsipikan (Russian: Ципикан) is a river in Buryatia, Russia. It is the second largest tributary of the Tsipa, after the Amalat, of the Vitim basin. The river is 329 kilometres (204 mi) long, and has a drainage basin of 6,710 square kilometres (2,590 sq mi). There is gold mining in the banks of the river.

== Course ==
The Tsipikan is a tributary of the Tsipa. It has its sources in the eastern slopes of the Ikat Range. First it flows northeastwards as it progresses across the mountains of the northwestern corner of the Vitim Plateau. Its course slows down and becomes marshy in the Kapylyushi lake area, south of the slopes of the Bolshoy Khapton. After a sharp turn to the southeast, and then northeast, it ends up flowing northwards meandering strongly and finally entering the eastern shore of lake Baunt. Tsipikan village is located on the right bank of the river.

There are many swampy stretches in the Tsipikan basin, as well as 863 lakes with a total area of 114 square kilometres (44 sq mi). The main tributaries of the Tsipikan are the 128 km (80 mi) long Taloy from the right, and the 113 km (70 mi) long Gorbylok. The river is frozen between mid October and end of April. The ice may reach a thickness of 1.5 m (4.9 ft).

== See also ==
- List of rivers of Russia
