= Tsipa =

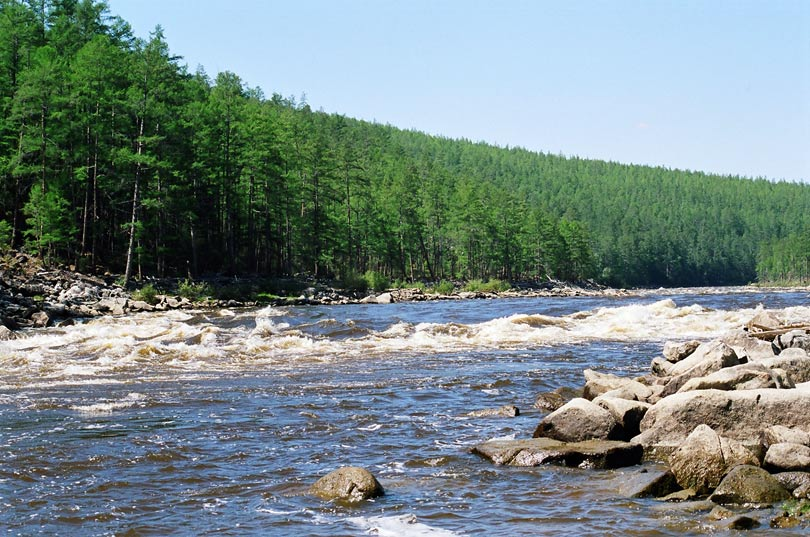

- Mouth location in Buryatia, Russia

Location
- Country: Russia

Physical characteristics
- Source: Southern Muya Range; Stanovoy Highlands; South Siberian System
  - coordinates: 55°02′44″N 111°49′40″E
  - elevation: 1,950 m (6,400 ft)
- Mouth: Vitim
  - coordinates: 55.379°N 115.9325°E
  - elevation: 550 m (1,800 ft)
- Length: 692 km (430 mi)
- Basin size: 42,200 km^{2} (16,300 sq mi)

Basin features
- Progression: Vitim→ Lena→ Laptev Sea

The Tsipa (Russian: Ципа) is the largest tributary of the Vitim in Buryatia, Russia. It is 692 kilometres (430 mi) long, and has a drainage basin of 42,200 square kilometres (16,300 sq mi). Maksim Perfilyev was the first Russian to reach the Tsipa in 1640.

Perch, pike, lenok, grayling, taimen and whitefish are found in the waters of the Tsipa.

== Course ==
The Tsipa is a western, left tributary of the Vitim. It has its sources in a tarn of the Southern Muya Range, in the area where this range merges with the Ikat Range. It is known as "Upper Tsipa" (Верхняя Ципа) in its upper course until its mouth in lake Baunt in the Baunt Depression in the northeastern part of the Vitim Plateau, near the Bolshoy Khapton Range. The river flows out of the lake in a NNE direction and slows down meandering across a swampy basin where there are many lakes, the largest of which is Busani. Then it makes a sharp bend to the west of the Bambuyka and turns south, crossing the Babanty Range through a narrow valley where it flows fast, forming rapids. After leaving the mountains it turns again northeast and finally it meets the Vitim about 120 km (75 mi) southeast of Taksimo.

Its main tributaries are the 329 km (204 mi) long Tsipikan and the 374 km (232 mi) long Amalat from the right. There are 3,227 lakes in the Tsipa basin, with a total area of 478 km^{2} (185 sq mi).

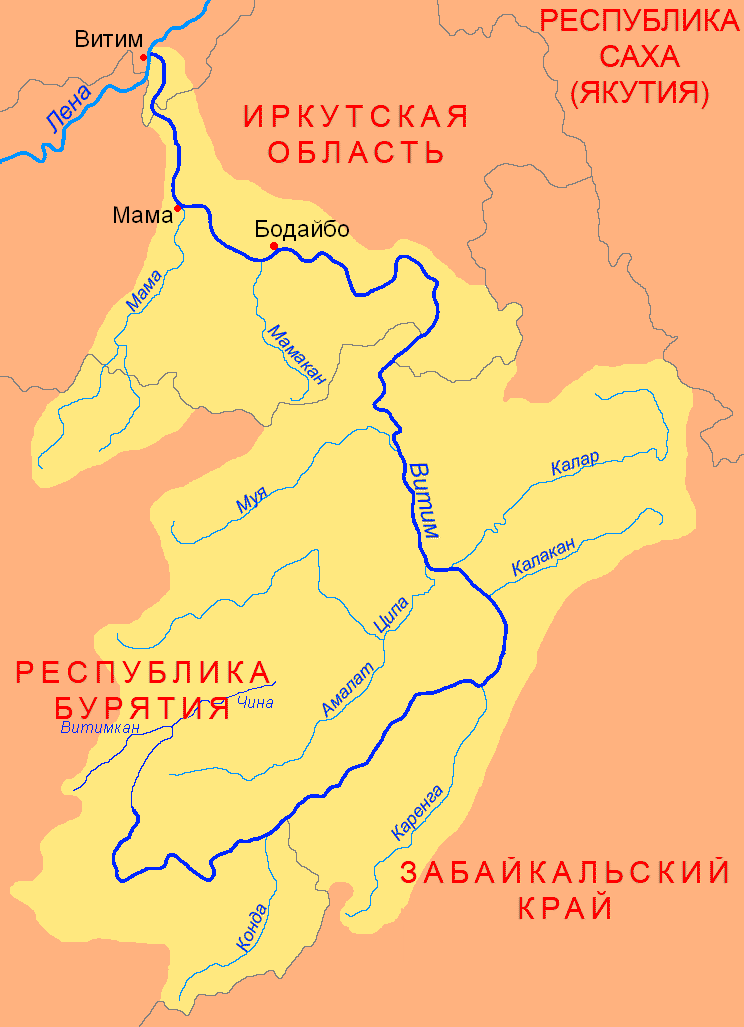
Basin of the Vitim.

== See also ==
- List of rivers of Russia
