= Bagdarin Airport =

Airport that serves Bagdarin, Russia

Bagdarin Airport Багдари́н Аэропорт
- IATA: none; ICAO: UIUB

Summary
- Airport type: Public / military
- Owner: Russian Federation
- Operator: JSC "Domestic Airport Bagdarin"
- Serves: Bagdarin
- Location: Bagdarin, Russia
- Time zone: Irkutsk Time (+8)
- Coordinates: 54°22′07″N 113°28′38″E

Map
- Location in Russia

Bagdarin Airport (Buryat: Багдари́н Аэропорт) serves Bagdarin, Buryatia, Russia.

== History ==
Bagdarin Airport was opened in October 1967 during the time of the Soviet Union. Initially, services were offered by Aeroflot. From 1968, Buryatia Airlines operated flights from the airport. In 1992 the airport was half closed. In 2007 it was closed for financial reasons. In 2013 the airport was re-opened, when PANH opened the new flight to Ulan-Ude. The service closed and by 2021 there were no scheduled flights to the airport.

== See also ==
- List of airports in Russia
