= Amalat =

River in Buryatia, Russia

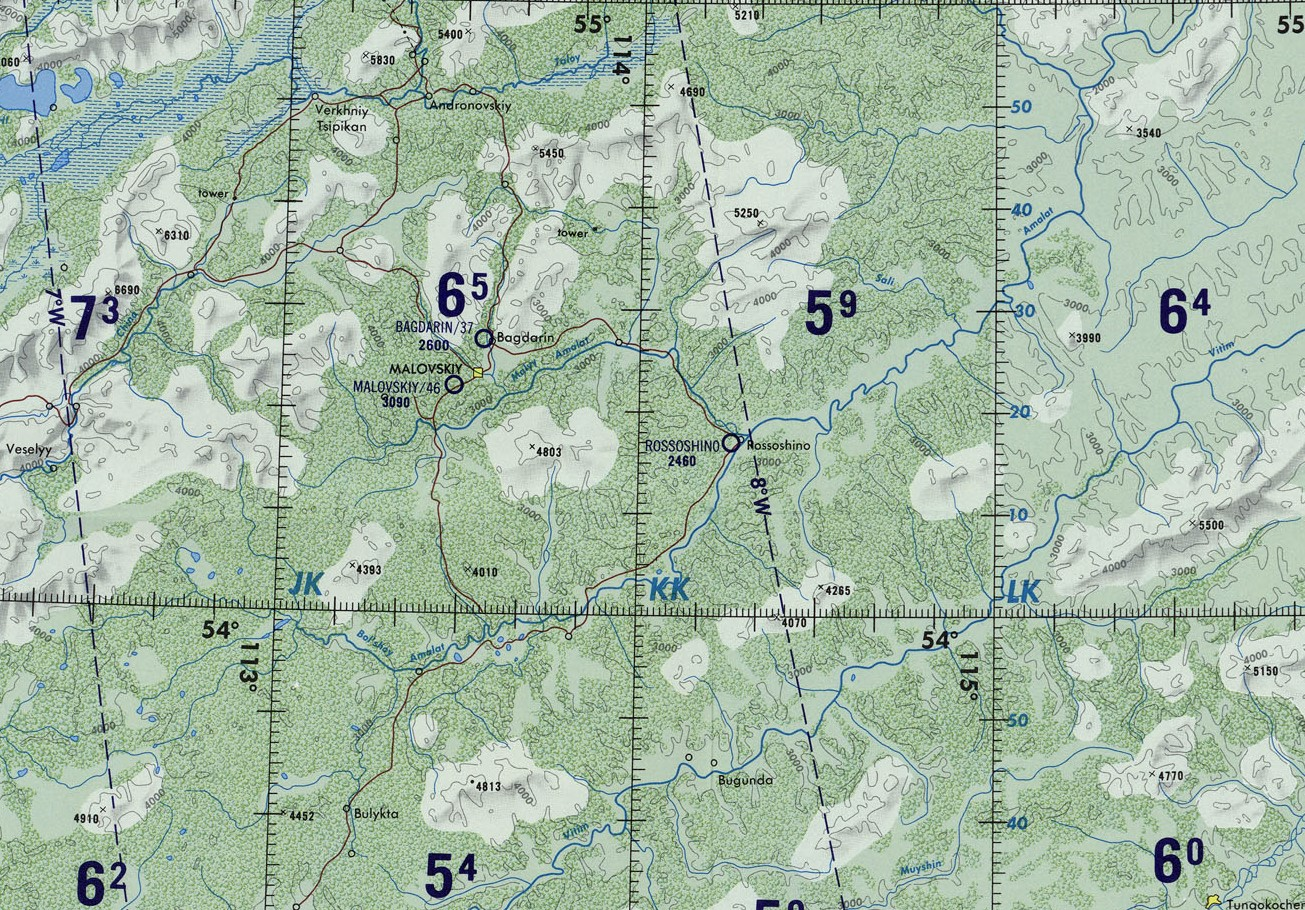
- Course of the Amalat river

- Mouth location in Buryatia, Russia

Location
- Country: Russia

Physical characteristics
- Source: Vitim Plateau
  - coordinates: 53°59′52″N 112°17′20″E
  - elevation: 1,950 m (6,400 ft)
- Mouth: Tsipa
  - coordinates: 54°51′31.89″N 115°13′44″E
  - elevation: 550 m (1,800 ft)
- Length: 374 km (232 mi)
- Basin size: 16,600 km^{2} (6,400 sq mi)
- Discharge
  - average: 80 m^{3}/s (2,800 cu ft/s)

Basin features
- Progression: Tsipa→Vitim→ Lena→ Laptev Sea

The Amalat (Russian: Амалат) is a river in Buryatia, Russia. It is the largest tributary of the Tsipa, of the Vitim basin. The river is 374 kilometres (232 mi) long, and has a drainage basin of 16,600 square kilometres (6,400 sq mi). The villages of Baysa, Mongoy and Rossoshino are the only inhabited places close to the banks of the river. There are jade deposits in the Amalat river basin, including the valuable white jade variety.

Grayling, lenok, taimen, pike, burbot, crucian carp and peled are among the fish species found in the waters of the Amalat. The river is a destination for rafting and kayaking.

== Course ==
The Amalat is a left tributary of the Tsipa. It has its sources in the southwestern slopes of the Vitim Plateau. It is known as Bolshoi Amalat (Big Amalat) in its upper course, before the confluence with its Maly Amalat (Little Amalat) tributary. The river flows roughly northeastwards and enters a floodplain in its middle reaches where its channel widens and begins meandering strongly, flowing almost parallel to the Vitim further south. Then it bends roughly northwards and finally meets the lower course of the Tsipa 133 km (83 mi) from its mouth in the Vitim. About 90% of the Amalat basin area is covered by forests, mainly larch and mountain taiga.

The main tributaries of the Amalat are the Antase, Zhilinda, Ashigli and Ukshum from the right, and the Khoygot, Little Amalat and Sali from the left. The longest tributary is the 135 km (84 mi) long Little Amalat. The river is frozen between October and May.

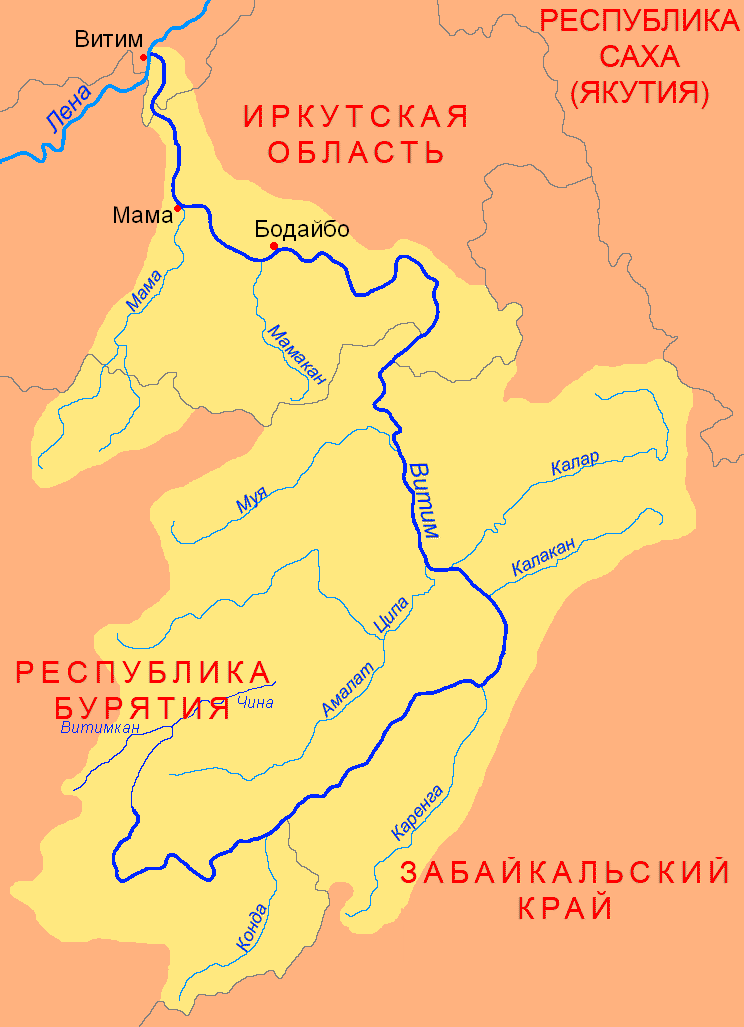
Basin of the Vitim with the Amalat in the lower centre.

== See also ==
- List of rivers of Russia
