= Southern Muya Range =

Mountain range in Russia

Southern Muya Range Южно-Муйский хребет
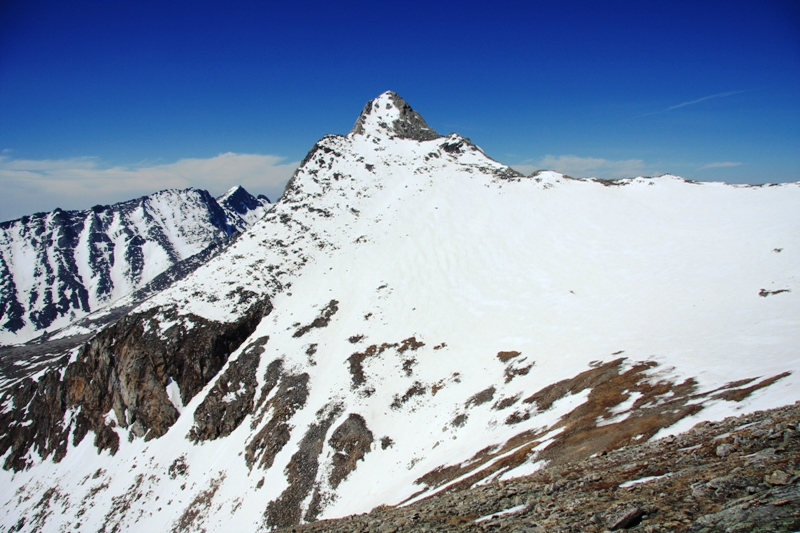
- View of a peak of the Southern Muya Range.

Highest point
- Peak: Muisky Gigant
- Elevation: 3,067 m (10,062 ft)
- Coordinates: 55°58′38″N 114°26′21″E

Dimensions
- Length: 400 km (250 mi) ENE-WSW
- Width: 80 km (50 mi)

Geography
- Location within Republic of Buryatia
- Country: Russia
- Federal subject: Buryatia / Zabaykalsky Krai
- Range coordinates: 55°43′N 114°05′E
- Parent range: Stanovoy Highlands; South Siberian System

Geology
- Rock type(s): Granite, slate, limestone

The Southern Muya Range (Russian: Южно-Муйский хребе́т, romanized: Yuzhno-Muyskiy khrebet) is a mountain range in Buryatia and Zabaykalsky Krai, Russia, part of the Stanovoy Highlands. The highest point of the range is 3,067 m high Muisky Gigant; another important peak is 2363 m high Mount Shaman.

== Geography ==
The Southern Muya Range is located in the Baikal Rift Zone, in the southwestern part of the Baikal-Stanovoy Region. It stretches from west to east for about 330 kilometres (210 mi) from the sources of the Barguzin river near the Ikat Range in the SSW, to the valley of the Bambuyka and Vitim in the east. In its eastern part it reaches a maximum width of 80 kilometres (50 mi). The mountain range is limited by the Muya-Kuanda Depression in the north, and by the Baunt Depression with the Tsipa valley in the south. Both the Bambuyka and the Tsipa are left tributaries of the Vitim.

=== Hydrography ===
Rivers Pravaya Shurinda and Dyaltukta, right tributaries of the Muya originate from the northwestern slopes of the axial or main Southern Muya Range. Lake Dorong is located at the southwestern end.

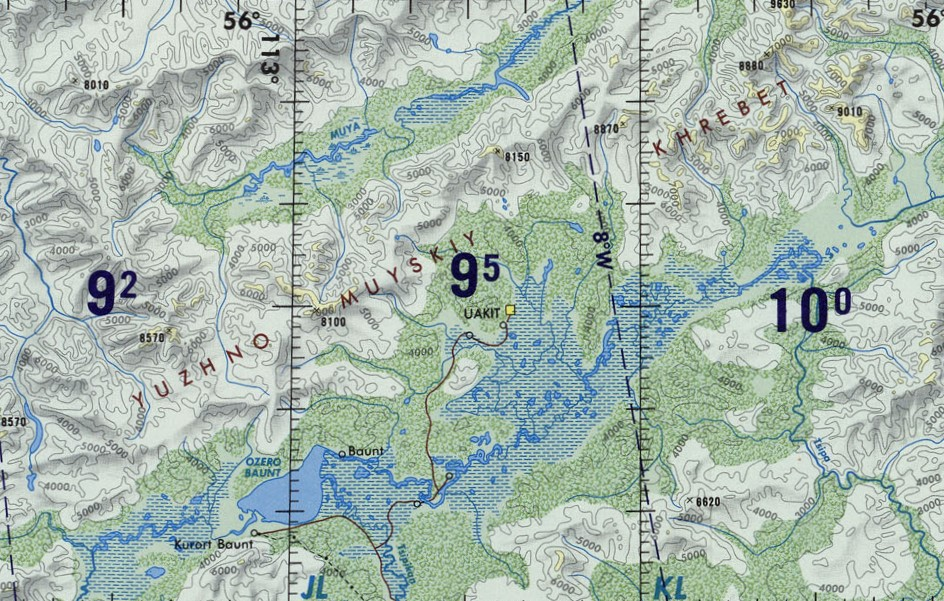
Southern Muya Range and Baunt lake.

== Flora ==
The slopes of the range are mainly covered with mountain taiga, with pre-alpine woodland and bare summits (golets) at higher elevations.

== See also ==
- List of mountains and hills of Russia
- Northern Muya Range
