= Vitim Plateau =

Plateau in Russia

- Вити́мское плоского́рье / Витимэй хадалиг газар
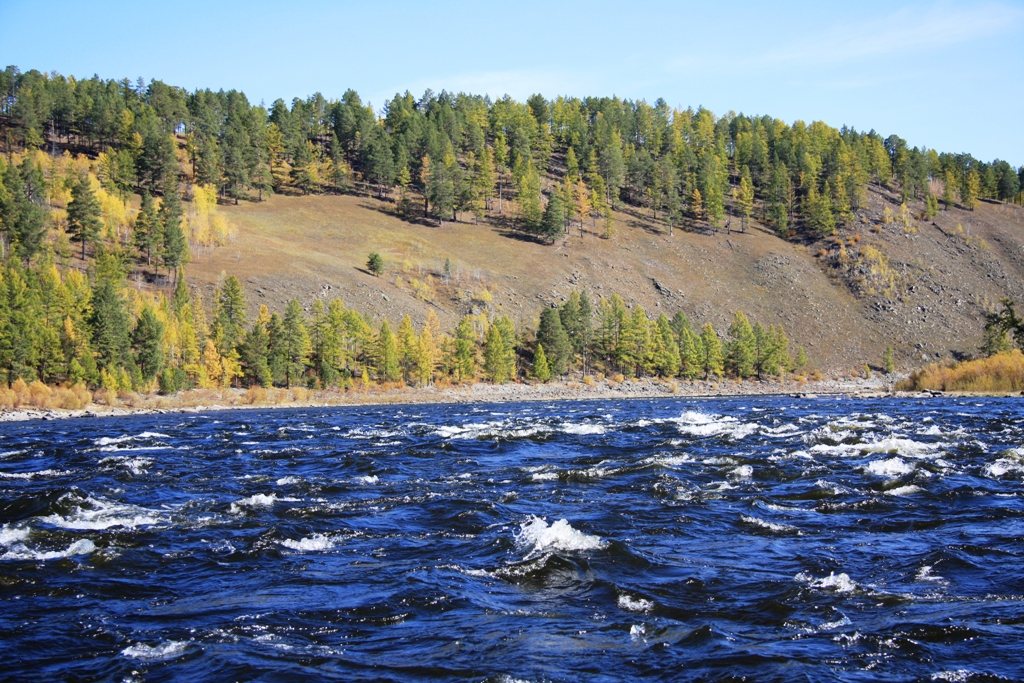
- The Vitim in its upper course flowing across the plateau

Highest point
- Elevation: 1,846 m (6,056 ft)

Dimensions
- Length: 450 km (280 mi)
- Width: 250 km (160 mi)
- Area: 10,000 km^{2} (3,900 mi^{2})

Geography
- Location within Republic of Buryatia
- Country: Russia
- Federal subject: Buryatia
- Region: Transbaikalia
- Range coordinates: 54°00′N 113°30′E
- Parent range: South Siberian System

Climbing
- Easiest route: From Bagdarin Airport

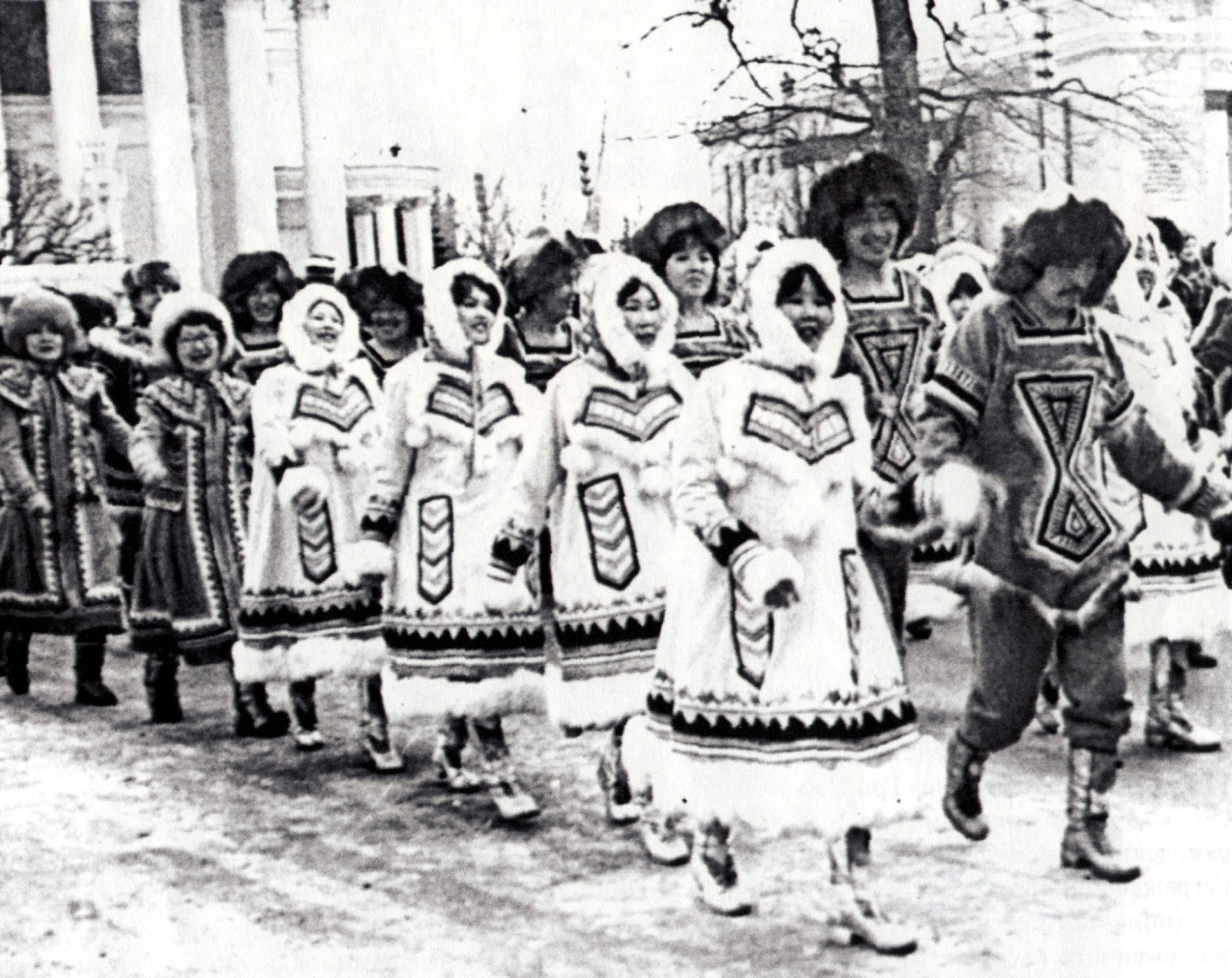
Parts of the Vitim Plateau have been traditionally inhabited by Evenks. Bauntovsky District.

Vitim Plateau is a plateau in Buryatia and Zabaykalsky Krai, Russia. The plateau is sparsely populated; the main settlements are Romanovka and Bagdarin. An area of the plateau is an ancient volcanic field with a number of cinder cones and volcanoes, the last of which was active about 810,000 years before present.

The P436 regional road connecting Ulan-Ude and Chita passes through Romanovka across the plateau.

== Geography ==
The Vitim Plateau lies along the headwaters of the Vitim River, a tributary of the Lena between the Southern Muya Range to the north, the Ikat Range to the west, the Yablonoi Mountains to the south, and in the east with the lower reaches of the Kalakan River to the right bank of the lower reaches of the Karenga River (both Vitim tributaries) and the latter's right tributary, the Bugarikta.

The Vitim River begins at the confluence of the China and Vitimkan rivers on the plateau and makes a wide bend around the volcanic zone before flowing northwards. Rivers Tsipa, Tsipikan and Amalat cut across the plateau and the Baunt Depression is located in the northwestern corner.

The plateau has a surface area of 10,000 square kilometres (3,900 sq mi). In it smooth, low mountain ranges such as the Bolshoy Khapton, with average heights between 1,200 metres (3,900 ft) and 1,600 metres (5,200 ft), alternate with intermontane basins. The Vitim Plateau is covered by larch taiga and forest steppe, as well as thickets of shrubby birches, meadows, and swampy areas in the river basins. The volcanic field in its southwestern part has an area of 4,500 square kilometres (1,700 sq mi). There are a number of lakes, such as Baunt, Busani, Kapylyushi, Telemba, Arakhley, Bolshoy and Maly Yeravna. The area is marked by permafrost.

== Volcanism ==
About five circular groups of volcanoes occur in the field, which is in turn subdivided into two major provinces. Both central volcanoes and cinder cones occur in the volcanic field, with the largest volcanoes reaching heights of 150 metres (490 ft) and diameters of 1.5 kilometres (0.93 mi).

=== Geology ===
Since the Oligocene and especially the Pliocene, the Asian Plate has been rifting apart in the Baikal Rift where the Siberian craton and a Paleozoic assembly of terranes (ancient microcontinents) form a contact zone. This rifting process is associated with volcanism in the neighbourhood of the rift zone, and this volcanism has produced about 5,000 cubic kilometres (1,200 cu mi) of volcanic rock in several volcanic fields, including the Udokan Plateau and the Vitim Plateau which are the largest volcanic fields of the Baikal Rift.

The reasons for the rifting process aren't well known. One theory holds that the collision between India and Asia and other tectonic processes triggered the pull-apart in the Baikal Rift. Another one postulates the existence of thermal anomalies such as a mantle plume beneath the Baikal Rift as the driving force of the rifting.

The basement beneath the Baikal Rift is granitic and up to 20 kilometres (12 mi) thick. It may be of Paleozoic age. Other rocks in the region are sediments close to river valleys and Mesozoic volcanic rocks.

==== Composition ====
Vitim Plateau volcanic rocks are mainly alkaline to subalkaline basalts, nephelinites and melanephelinites, with phenocryst phases containing clinopyroxene, olivine and plagioclase. Younger rocks have a tendency towards alkaline compositions.

The melts that give rise to Vitim Plateau magmas appear to originate in the lithospheric mantle, starting from garnet pyroxenite and peridotite and leaving phlogopite as residual phase when starting from pyroxenite. Petrology indicates that a complex magma production process takes place beneath the Vitim Plateau, including remelting and crystallization.

=== Eruption history ===
Two volcanic phases have been identified in the Vitim Plateau. The first took place during the Miocene; potassium-argon dating has yielded ages of 10.65 - 6.6 million years ago.

The second occurred during the Pleistocene with the most recent eruption dated 810,000 years ago. Later volcanic activity was concentrated in river valleys and cones on the surface of the plateau.
