= South Siberian Mountains =

Series of mountain ranges in Russia and Mongolia

- Южно-Сибирские горы
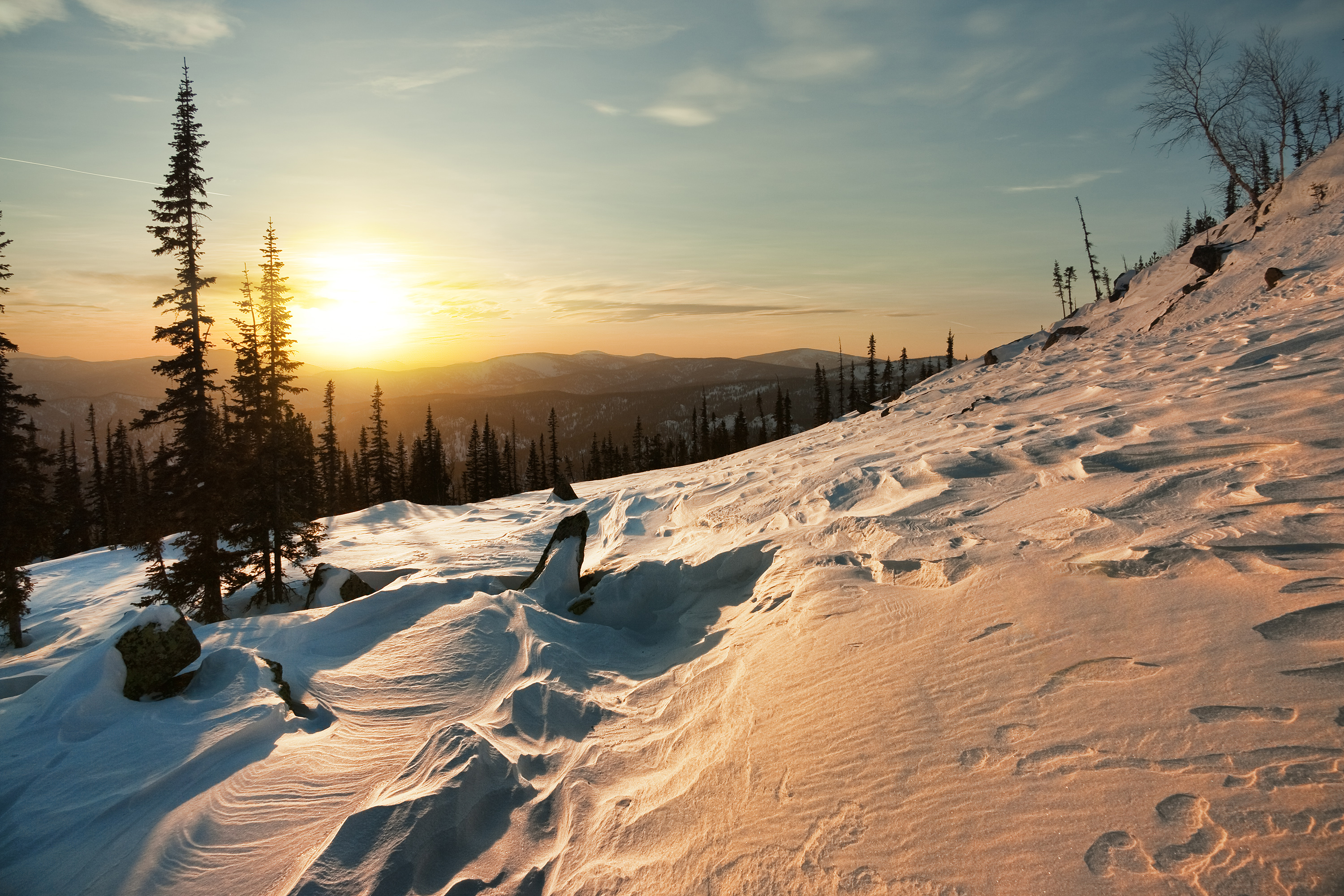
- Sunset over the Kuznetsk Alatau

Highest point
- Peak: Belukha Mountain
- Elevation: 4,506 m (14,783 ft)
- Coordinates: 51°45′N 101°00′E

Dimensions
- Length: 3,000 km (1,900 mi) E/W
- Area: 1,500,000 square kilometres (580,000 sq mi)

Geography
- Location within Russia
- Location: Altai Republic, Altai Territory, Kemerovo Oblast, Tuva, Khakassia, Krasnoyarsk Krai, Irkutsk Oblast, Buryatia, Zabaykalsky Krai

Geology
- Orogeny: Alpine orogeny

The South Siberian Mountains (Russian: Южно-Сибирские горы, romanized: Yuzhno-Sibirskiye Gory) are one of the largest mountain systems in North Asia. The total area of the system of mountain ranges is more than 1.5 million km^{2}. The South Siberian Mountains are located in the Siberian and Far Eastern Federal Districts of Russia, as well as partly in Mongolia. The territory of the mountain system is one of the Great Russian Regions.

== Geography ==
The system is composed of a number of ranges aligned in an east–west direction stretching for almost 3,000 kilometres (1,900 mi). Part of them are near the border with Mongolia and China, while others rise further north. To the south the South Siberian ranges merge with the Mongolian and Chinese mountain chains and plateaus. In the west lies the Dzungarian Basin and to the east the Mongolian Plateau. To the north the South Siberian Mountains merge with the West Siberian Lowland and the Central Siberian Plateau, both on the Russian side. To the southeast the Baikal Range is separated from the Eastern Sayan by the Baikal Rift Zone and the Tunkin Depression. To the northeast of its eastern end the South Siberian mountain system merges with the East Siberian Mountains.

Geologically the mountains of the system underwent a process of rejuvenation during the Alpine orogeny. Earthquakes are common all across the area of the system.

Owing to the mountainous terrain, large swathes of the South Siberian system are uninhabited. The main cities of the vast region are, from west to east: Krasnoyarsk, Angarsk, Irkutsk, Ulan-Ude and Chita.

=== Ranges ===
- Altai Mountains
  - Saylyugem Mountains
  - Chuya Belki
  - Kuray Mountains
- Salair Ridge
- Kuznetsk Alatau
  - Koshkulak (mountain range)
  - Kharatas ridge
  - Sunduki mountain range
- Sayan Mountains ( Western and Eastern )
  - Ergaki
  - Kitoy Range
  - Kropotkin Range (Eastern Sayan)
- Tannu Ola
- Baikal Range
- Khamar Daban
- Ulan-Burgas
- Barguzin Range
- Yablonoi Mountains
- Chersky Range (Transbaikalia)
- Olyokma-Stanovik
- Khentei-Daur Highlands
  - Khentei Range
  - Chikokon Range
  - Stanovik Range
- Ikat Range
- Vitim Plateau
  - Bolshoy Khapton
- Selenga Highlands
- Stanovoy Highlands
  - Kalar Range
  - Udokan Range
  - Kodar Range
  - Delyun-Uran Range
  - Northern Muya Range
  - Southern Muya Range
- North Baikal Highlands
  - Akitkan Range
  - Synnyr Massif
  - Upper Angara Range
- Patom Highlands
  - Kropotkin Range
- Olyokma-Chara Plateau
- Aldan Highlands
  - Sunnagyn Range
- Stanovoy Range
  - Toko-Stanovik
- Primorsky Range
Gallery
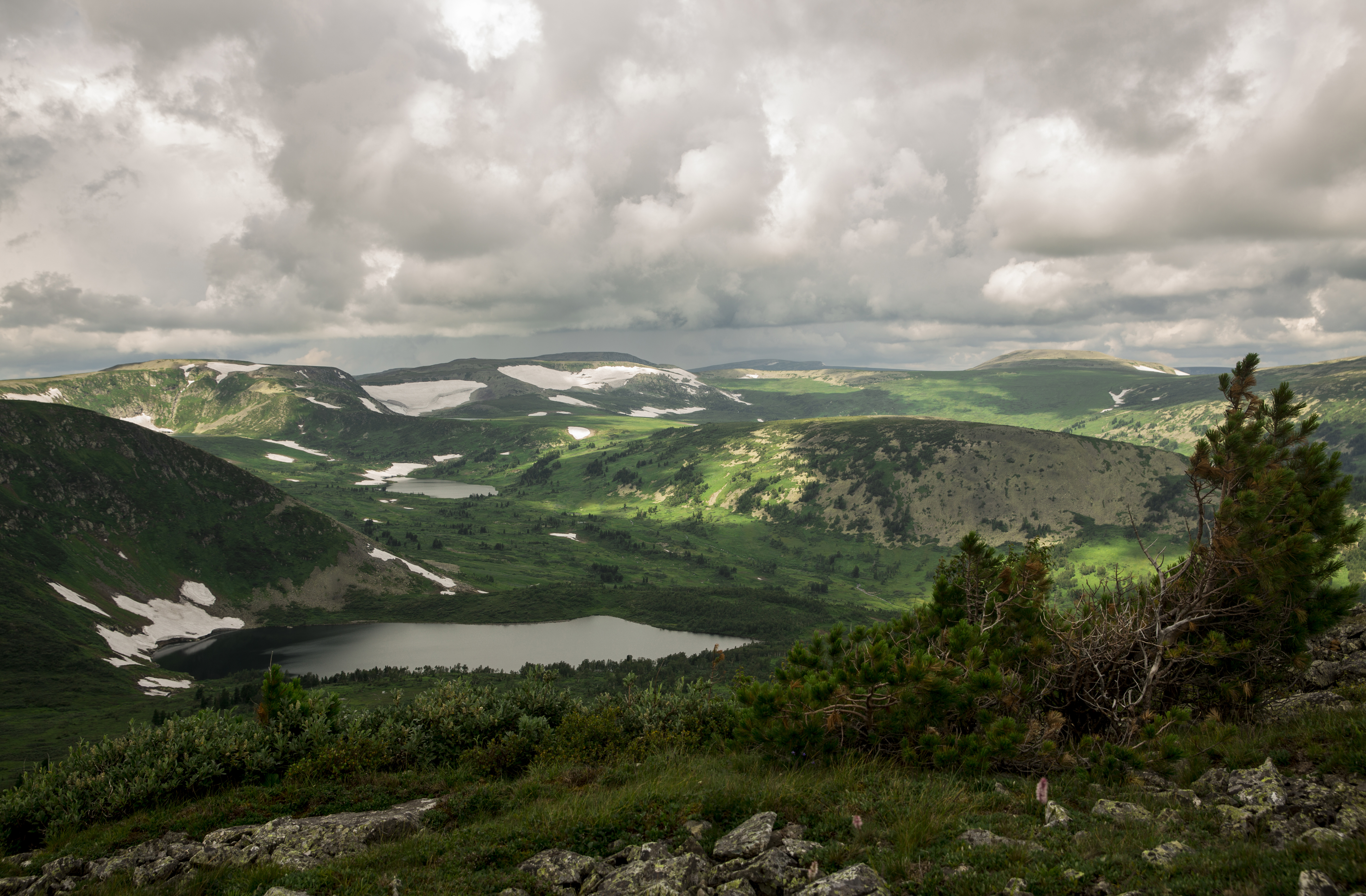
South Siberian Mountains, Kuznetsk Alatau.

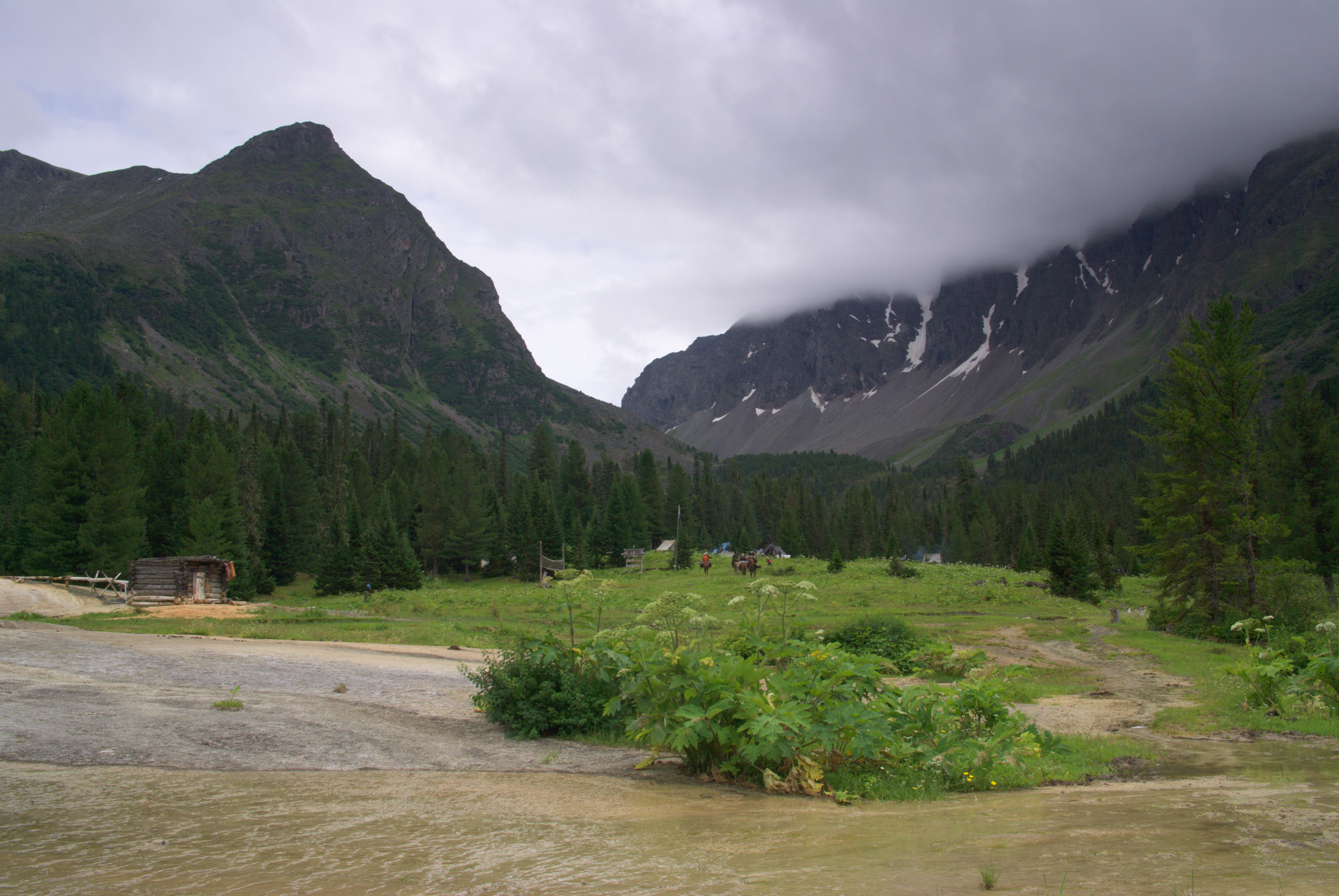
View of the Sayan Range in Northern Tuva.

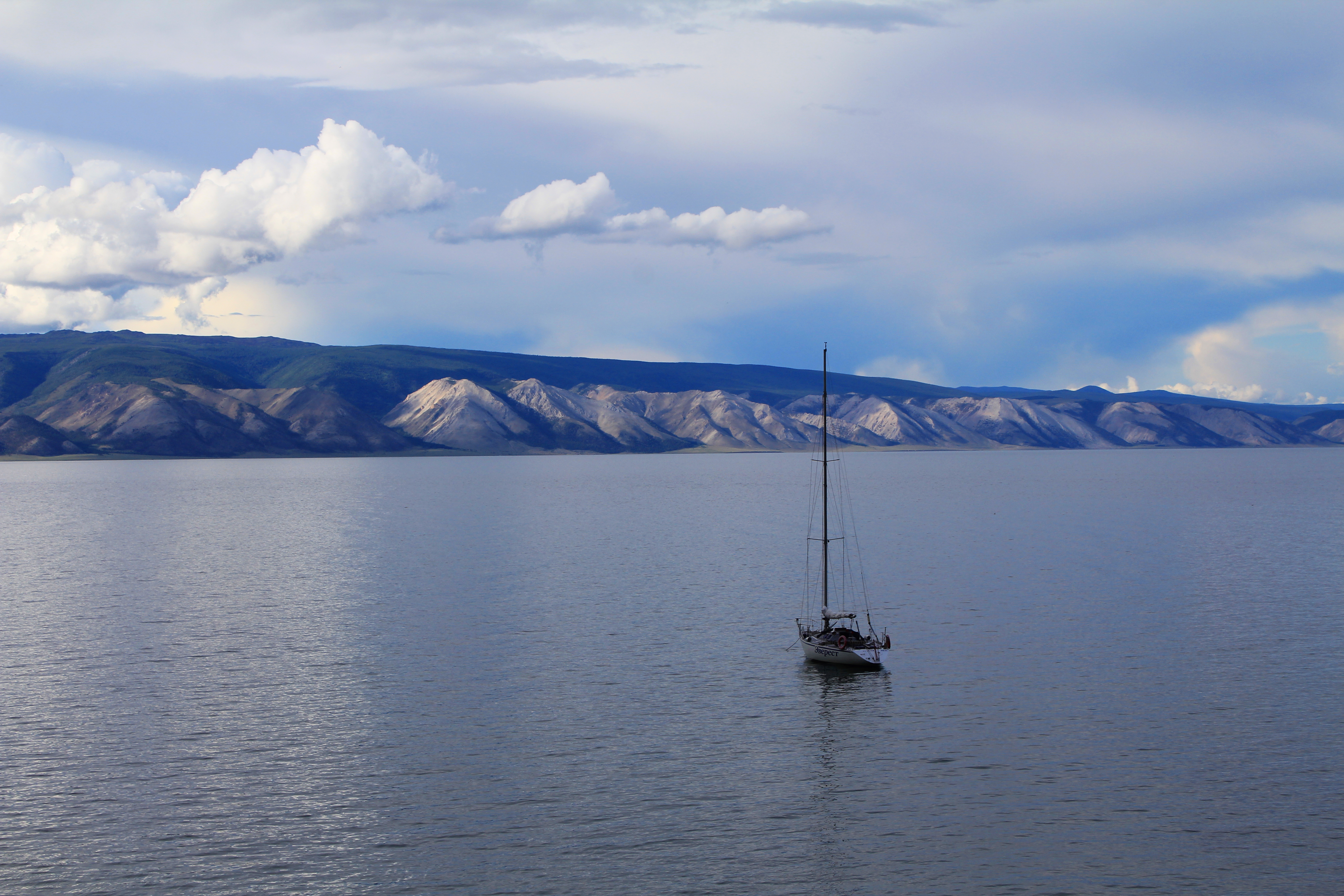
The Primorsky Range rising above the western shores of Lake Baikal.

=== Hydrography ===
Some of the main rivers of Siberia have their origin in the South Siberian mountain system, such as the Lena, Irtysh, the Yenisei and the Ob River. Other rivers of the area are the Argun, Tom, Shilka, Selenga, Katun and the Biya River. The great Lake Baikal is the most well-known lake of the region. Other much smaller lakes are Lake Teletskoye, Lake Markakol, Lake Todzha (Azas), Baunt and Noyon-Khol.

== See also ==
- Golets (geography)
- List of ecoregions in Russia
