= Bauntovsky District =

Bauntovsky District Баунтовский район (Russian)
- District

Other transcription(s)
  - Buryat: Бабанта (Баунтын) аймаг
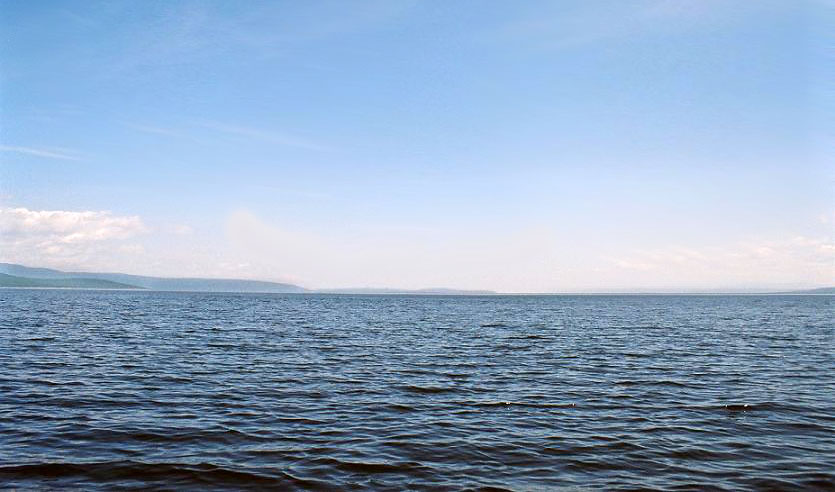
- Lake Baunt in Bauntovsky District

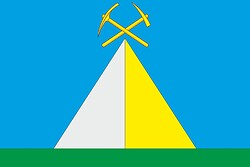
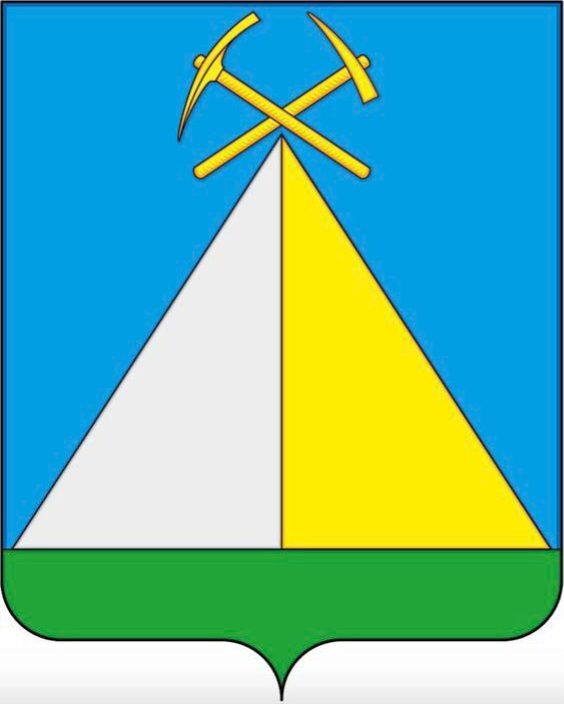
- Flag Coat of arms
- Location of Bauntovsky District in the Buryat Republic
- Coordinates: 54°40′N 114°30′E
- Country: Russia
- Federal subject: Republic of Buryatia
- Established: 1925
- Administrative center: Bagdarin

Area
  - Total: 66,816 km^{2} (25,798 sq mi)

Population (2010 Census)
  - Total: 9,667
  - Estimate (January 2013): 9,161
  - Density: 0.1447/km^{2} (0.3747/sq mi)
  - Urban: 0%
  - Rural: 100%

Administrative structure
  - Administrative divisions: 9 Selsoviets
  - Inhabited localities: 24 rural localities

Municipal structure
  - Municipally incorporated as: Bauntovsky Municipal District
  - Municipal divisions: 0 urban settlements, 9 rural settlements
- Time zone: UTC+8 (MSK+5)
- OKTMO ID: 81606000
- Website: http://www.bauntrb.ru

Population of Bauntovsky District
- 2010 Census: 9,667
- 2002 Census: 10,907
- 1989 Census: 26,594
- 1979 Census: 12,033

Bauntovsky District (Russian: Ба́унтовский райо́н; Buryat: Бабанта (Баунтын) аймаг, Babanta (Bauntyn) aimag) is an administrative and municipal district (raion), one of the twenty-one in the Republic of Buryatia, Russia. It is located in the northeast of the republic. The area of the district is 66,816 square kilometers (25,798 sq mi). Its administrative center is the rural locality (a selo) of Bagdarin. As of the 2010 Census, the total population of the district was 9,667, with the population of Bagdarin accounting for 49.0% of that number.

== Etymology ==
The district is named after Lake Baunt.

== Geography ==
Most of the district's territory is located on the Vitim Plateau. To the west rises the Ikat Range and to the northeast, the Babanty Mountains, stretching from southwest to northeast from the Big Khapton and Little Khapton ridges to the Vitim River. The Southern Muya Range rises in the northwestern sector of the district, with lake Dorong. The Baunt Depression, along which the Tsipa River flows, stretches between the Tsipikan Mountains and the South Muya Range. Baunt, after which the district is named, as well as Busani are lakes located in the depression. To the southwest the Kapylyushi lake is on the northern side of the Tsipikan banks.

== Administrative and municipal status ==
Within the framework of administrative divisions, Bauntovsky District is one of the twenty-one in the Republic of Buryatia. The district is divided into nine selsoviets, comprising twenty-four rural localities. As a municipal division, the district is incorporated as Bauntovsky Municipal District. Its nine selsoviets are incorporated as nine rural settlements within the municipal district. The selo of Bagdarin serves as the administrative center of both the administrative and municipal district.

== Demographics ==
As of the 2010 Census the ethnic breakdown of Bauntovsky District was the following:
Russians: 76.08%
Buryats: 14.07%
Evenks: 5.04%
Others: 4.81%
