= Bagdarin =

Bagdarin Багдарин
- Selo
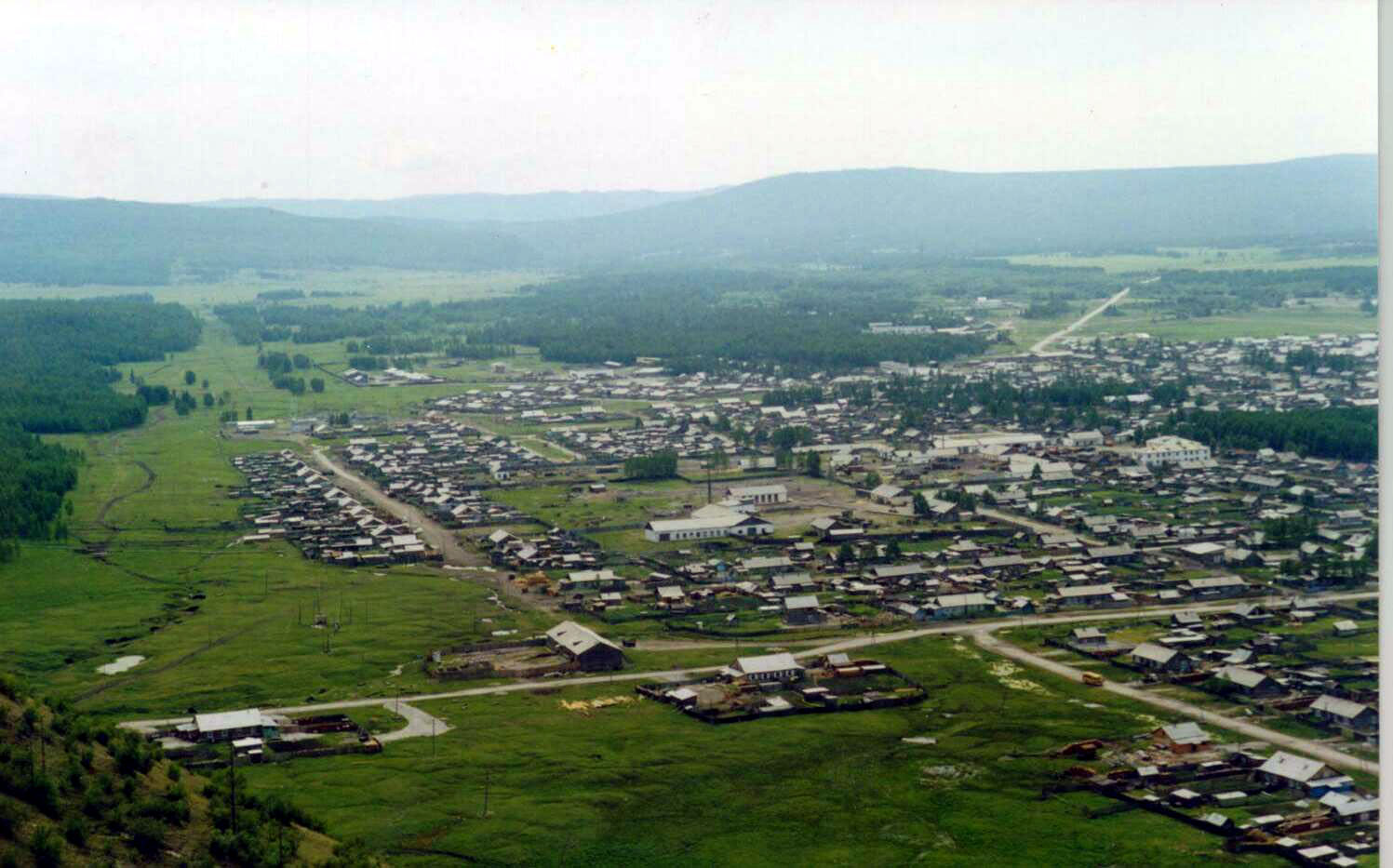

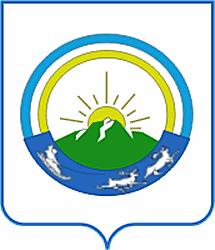
- Coat of arms
- Interactive map of Bagdarin
- Location of Bagdarin Bagdarin (Republic of Buryatia)
- Coordinates: 54°26′40″N 113°35′10″E
- Country: Russia
- Federal subject: Buryatia
- Administrative district: Bauntovsky Evenkiysky District
- Founded: 1932
- Elevation: 898 m (2,946 ft)

Population (2010 Census)
  - Total: 4,735
  - Estimate (2021): 4,525 (−4.4%)

Administrative status
  - Capital of: Bauntovsky Evenkiysky District
- Time zone: UTC+8 (MSK+5)
- Postal code: 671510
- OKTMO ID: 81606415101

Bagdarin (Russian: Багдари́н; Buryat: Сагаан Уула, Sagaan Uula), is a rural locality (a selo) and the administrative center of Bauntovsky Evenkiysky District of the Republic of Buryatia, Russia, located on the Vitim Plateau. Population: 4,735 (2010 census); 4,763 (2002 census); 4,825 (1989 Soviet census).

== Geography ==
The village is located in the Vitim Plateau. Bagdarin means "white" in Evenki language (Evenki: багдарин). Above the northern side of the village rises the "White Mountain", a barren hill composed of dolomite rock.

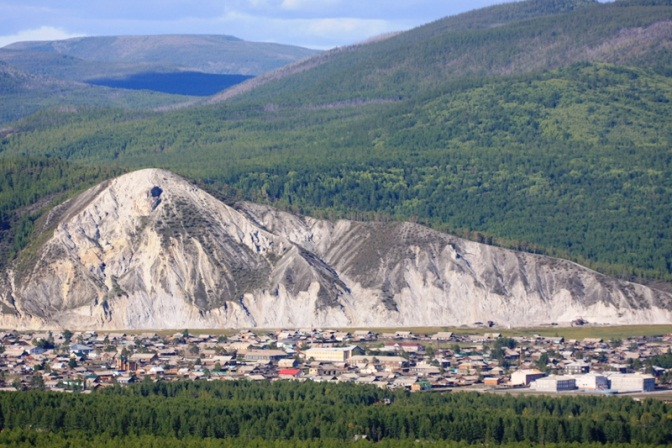
The "White Mountain" (Белая гора) rising above Bagdarin.

== Transportation ==
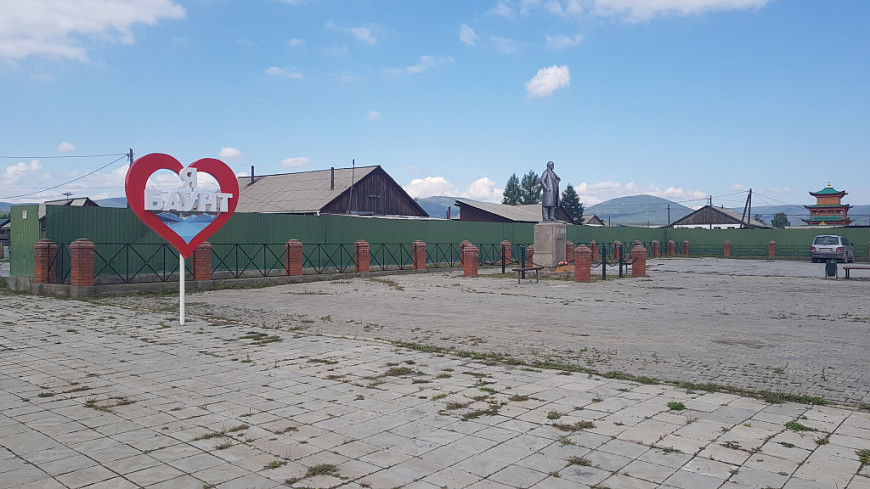
Composition "I love Baunt" at the monument to Lenin. Bagdarin. Bauntovsky district, Buryatia

Bagdarin is served by the Bagdarin Airport. Road P437 connects Bagdarin with Romanovka, located 172 kilometres (107 mi) away.

== Climate ==
Bagdarin has a subarctic climate (Köppen climate classification Dwc) with severely cold but dry winters and mildly warm, short, and humid summers. Diurnal temperature variation is quite high in this town. Precipitation is quite low, but is much higher in summer than at other times of the year.

Climate data for Bagdarin
Month	Jan	Feb	Mar	Apr	May	Jun	Jul	Aug	Sep	Oct	Nov	Dec	Year
Record high °C (°F)	1.7 (35.1)	8.0 (46.4)	12.2 (54.0)	23.0 (73.4)	30.3 (86.5)	33.8 (92.8)	35.1 (95.2)	32.6 (90.7)	29.6 (85.3)	24.1 (75.4)	10.3 (50.5)	0.2 (32.4)	35.1 (95.2)
Mean daily maximum °C (°F)	−19.7 (−3.5)	−12.4 (9.7)	−4.3 (24.3)	4.7 (40.5)	13.6 (56.5)	21.4 (70.5)	23.5 (74.3)	20.6 (69.1)	13.6 (56.5)	3.7 (38.7)	−9.7 (14.5)	−19.5 (−3.1)	3.0 (37.3)
Daily mean °C (°F)	−27.6 (−17.7)	−22.8 (−9.0)	−14.6 (5.7)	−3.3 (26.1)	5.4 (41.7)	12.6 (54.7)	15.7 (60.3)	13.1 (55.6)	5.9 (42.6)	−4.2 (24.4)	−17.6 (0.3)	−26.4 (−15.5)	−5.3 (22.4)
Mean daily minimum °C (°F)	−35.5 (−31.9)	−33.2 (−27.8)	−24.9 (−12.8)	−11.3 (11.7)	−2.8 (27.0)	3.8 (38.8)	7.9 (46.2)	5.5 (41.9)	−1.9 (28.6)	−12.0 (10.4)	−25.5 (−13.9)	−33.3 (−27.9)	−13.6 (7.5)
Record low °C (°F)	−50.2 (−58.4)	−51.6 (−60.9)	−45.0 (−49.0)	−36.6 (−33.9)	−17.6 (0.3)	−9.0 (15.8)	−4.4 (24.1)	−8.9 (16.0)	−16.8 (1.8)	−33.3 (−27.9)	−44.5 (−48.1)	−49.0 (−56.2)	−51.6 (−60.9)
Average precipitation mm (inches)	1.9 (0.07)	1.8 (0.07)	2.9 (0.11)	11.4 (0.45)	23.2 (0.91)	63.6 (2.50)	105.5 (4.15)	94.6 (3.72)	39.2 (1.54)	9.6 (0.38)	5.6 (0.22)	3.2 (0.13)	362.5 (14.25)
Average precipitation days (≥ 0.1 mm)	3.0	2.6	2.9	5.3	7.2	11.9	15.4	14.6	9.0	4.7	4.6	4.3	85.5
Average relative humidity (%)	78.3	75.9	69.3	60.0	57.7	63.5	68.3	72.8	74.8	75.8	77.8	78.8	71.1
Mean monthly sunshine hours	125	170	223	237	263	256	247	213	181	181	133	104	2,333
Source: climatebase.ru (1936-2012)
