= Maloye Yeravnoye =

Lake in Buryatia, Russia

- Малое Еравное озеро / Бага Ярууна
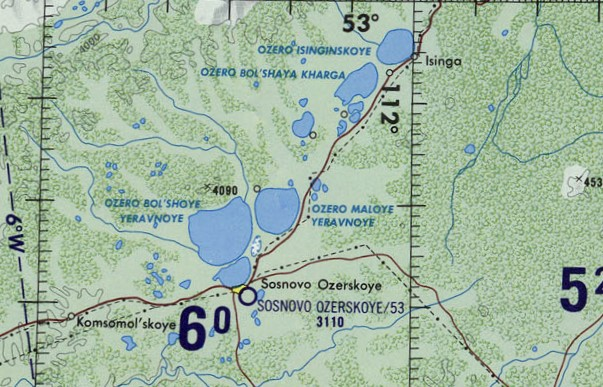
- Yeravna-Khorga Lake System

- Location in Buryatia, Russian Far East
- Location: Vitim Plateau; South Siberian System
- Coordinates: 52°39′25″N 111°38′20″E
- Primary inflows: Domnaya, Tuldun
- Catchment area: 1,530 km^{2} (590 sq mi)
- Basin countries: Buryatia, Russia
- Max. length: 9.5 km (5.9 mi)
- Max. width: 8.5 km (5.3 mi)
- Surface area: 60.5 km^{2} (23.4 sq mi)
- Average depth: 1.8 m (5.9 ft)
- Max. depth: 3.5 m (11 ft)
- Surface elevation: 949 m (3,114 ft)
- Frozen: October to May
- Islands: None
- Settlements: Tuldun and Shiringa

Maloye Yeravnoye (Russian: Малое Еравное озеро; Russian Buryat: Бага Ярууна) is a fresh water body in the Yeravninsky District, Buryatia, Russia. There are two inhabited places by the lake, Tuldun in the northwestern shore and Shiringa in the northeastern.

The Yeravninsky penitentiary settlement was established by Russian Cossack explorers on the eastern bank of the lake in 1675. But by the beginning of the 18th century the prison had lost relevance and only 11 houses and the former prison clerk hut remained.

== Geography ==
Maloye Yeravnoye (Lesser Yeravna) is part of the Yeravna-Khorga Lake System (Russian: Еравно-Хоргинской системы озёр), which includes 6 large lakes and a number of smaller ones. It is located at the southwestern end of the lake group, together with Bolshoye Yeravnoye to the west, separated from it by a narrow landspit. Lake Sosnovo lies further to the southwest and small Lake Khaimisanov to the south. The lake is shallow, with an average depth not reaching 2 m (6.6 ft).

The Maloye Yeravnoye has a 1,530 km^{2} (590 sq mi) catchment area made up of forest steppe. Maloye Yeravnoye is fed by two rivers, the Domnaya, flowing from the southeast, and one of the branches of the Tuldun which enters the lake in the northwest. In dry years the lake dries almost completely, but when the water levels are high the Yeravna lakes are connected with each other by intermittent channels. The outlet is via the Khorga lakes to the northeast through the Kholoy, a small, shallow tributary of the Vitim River flowing from Isinga lake at the northeastern end. The lake is fed by snow and rain, but since it lies in an area of variable moisture, it can have significant fluctuations in the water level from year to year.

== Flora and fauna ==
The shores are low and gentle, overgrown with grassy vegetation and bushes in places, interspersed with sandy stretches. The water of the lake is fresh and has a greenish color. The southwestern, western and northern shores are overgrown with sedges, Glyceria, Scolochloa and Phalaris forming dense thickets, with Beckmannia and grass rush, among others, in certain areas. Further from the shore Sparganium, arrowhead, horsetail, bulrush and reeds may grow.

The eastern and northeastern shores of the lake are pebbly and sandy. They are mostly free of emerging aquatic vegetation. Submerged plants may grow in the bottom, such as Potamogeton, Myriophyllum, hornwort, as well as algae (Chara) and water moss. The aquatic plant Elodea canadensis entered the lake over a decade ago and has become an invasive species, much like in neighboring Bolshoye Yeravnoye.

Amphipods are abundant in sandy areas. Among the other benthic fauna nematodes, oligochaetes, leeches, mollusks, water mites, as well as the larvae of biting midges, chironomids and dragonflies deserve mention. Crucian carp, perch, roach, pike and peled are the common fish species in the lake.

== See also ==
- List of lakes of Russia
