= Shiringa =

Shiringa Ширинга
- Settlement
- Location within Republic of Buryatia Location within Russia
- Coordinates: 52°40′N 111°42′E
- Country: Russia
- Region: Republic of Buryatia
- District: Yeravninsky District
- Time zone: UTC+8:00

Shiringa (Russian: Ширинга; Buryat: Шэрэнгэ, Sherenge) is a rural locality (a settlement) in Yeravninsky District, Republic of Buryatia, Russia. The population was 579 as of 2010. There are 67 streets.

== Geography ==
Shiringa is located 22 km northeast of Sosnovo-Ozerskoye (the district's administrative centre) by road, by the shore of the Maly Yeravna lake, part of the Yeravna-Khorga Lake System. Tuldun is the nearest rural locality.
