= Lake Nerpichye =

Lake Nerpichye (Russian: Нерпичье озеро) may refer to the following lakes in Russia:

- Lake Nerpichye (Kamchatka Krai)
- Lake Nerpichye (Sakha Republic)
