= Ukyr =

Ukyr Укыр
- Selo
- Location within Republic of Buryatia Location within Russia
- Coordinates: 52°31′N 111°24′E
- Country: Russia
- Region: Republic of Buryatia
- District: Yeravninsky District
- Time zone: UTC+8:00

Ukyr (Russian: Укыр; Buryat: Υхэр, Ükher) is a rural locality (a selo) in Yeravninsky District, Republic of Buryatia, Russia. The population was 90 as of 2019. There is 1 street.

== Geography ==
Ukyr is located 12 km west of Sosnovo-Ozerskoye (the district's administrative centre) by road. Sosnovo-Ozerskoye is the nearest rural locality.
