= Gonda, Republic of Buryatia =

Gonda Гонда
- Selo
- Location within Republic of Buryatia Location within Russia
- Coordinates: 52°31′N 111°14′E
- Country: Russia
- Region: Republic of Buryatia
- District: Yeravninsky District
- Time zone: UTC+8:00

Gonda (Russian: Гонда) is a rural locality (a selo) and the administrative centre of Ulkhaaskoye Rural Settlement, Yeravninsky District, Republic of Buryatia, Russia. The population was 507 as of 2017. There are 9 streets.

== Geography ==
Gonda is located 23 km west of Sosnovo-Ozerskoye (the district's administrative centre) by road. Ukyr is the nearest rural locality.
