= Poperechnoye, Republic of Buryatia =

Poperechnoye Поперечное
- Selo
- Location within Republic of Buryatia Location within Russia
- Coordinates: 52°23′N 110°42′E
- Country: Russia
- Region: Republic of Buryatia
- District: Yeravninsky District
- Time zone: UTC+8:00

Poperechnoye (Russian: Поперечное; Buryat: Тайлууд, Tailuud) is a rural locality (a selo) in Yeravninsky District, Republic of Buryatia, Russia. The population is 383, as of 2010. There are 15 streets.

== Geography ==
Poperechnoye is located 60 km southwest of Sosnovo-Ozerskoye (the district's administrative centre) by road. Mozhayka is the nearest rural locality.
