= Khorga =

Khorga Хорга
- Settlement
- Location within Republic of Buryatia Location within Russia
- Coordinates: 52°49′N 111°49′E
- Country: Russia
- Region: Republic of Buryatia
- District: Yeravninsky District
- Time zone: UTC+8:00

Khorga (Russian: Хорга; Buryat: Хорго, Khorgo) is a rural locality (a settlement) in Yeravninsky District, Republic of Buryatia, Russia. The population was 127 as of 2010. There are 4 streets.

== Geography ==
Khorga is located by Malaya Khorga lake, part of the Yeravna-Khorga Lake System , 41 km (25 mi) north of Sosnovo-Ozerskoye (the district's administrative centre) by road. Gunda is the nearest rural locality.
