= Tselinny, Republic of Buryatia =

Tselinny Целинный
- Settlement
- Location within Republic of Buryatia Location within Russia
- Coordinates: 52°36′N 112°51′E
- Country: Russia
- Region: Republic of Buryatia
- District: Yeravninsky District
- Time zone: UTC+8:00

Tselinny (Russian: Целинный) is a rural locality (a settlement) and the administrative centre of Tselinnoye Rural Settlement, Yeravninsky District, Republic of Buryatia, Russia. The population was 417 as of 2017. There are 11 streets.

== Geography ==
Tselinny is located 232 km east of Sosnovo-Ozerskoye (the district's administrative centre) by road. Telemba is the nearest rural locality. The Konda River flows near the village.
