= Telemba =

Telemba Телемба
- Selo
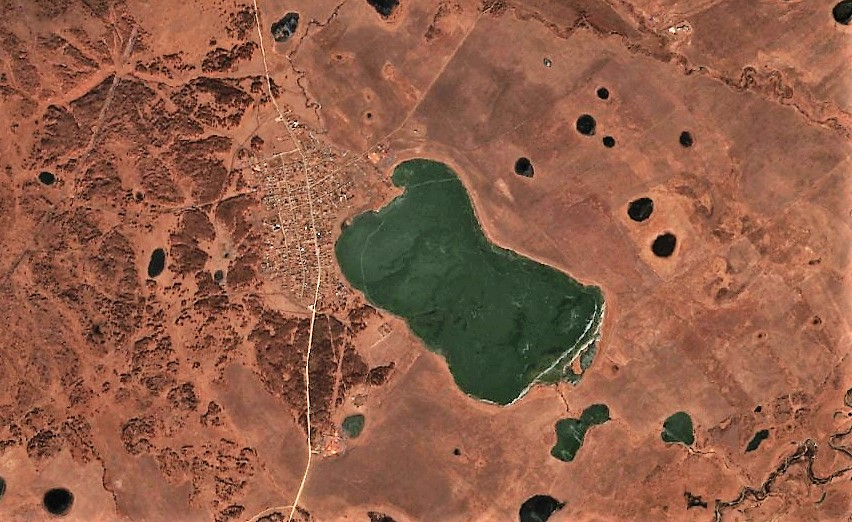
- Telemba Sentinel-2 image

- Location within Republic of Buryatia Location within Russia
- Coordinates: 52°44′N 113°17′E
- Country: Russia
- Region: Republic of Buryatia
- District: Yeravninsky District
- Time zone: UTC+8:00

Telemba (Russian: Телемба; Buryat: Тэлэмбэ, Telembe) is a rural locality (a selo) and the administrative centre of Kondisnkoye Rural Settlement, Yeravninsky District, Republic of Buryatia, Russia. The population was 1,256 as of 2017. There are 16 streets.

Near the village there is a military training ground of the Eastern Military District of the Russian Armed Forces.

== Geography ==
Telemba is located 194 km east of Sosnovo-Ozerskoye (the district's administrative centre) by road, close to lake Telemba. The Konda River flows to the east and southeast of the village.

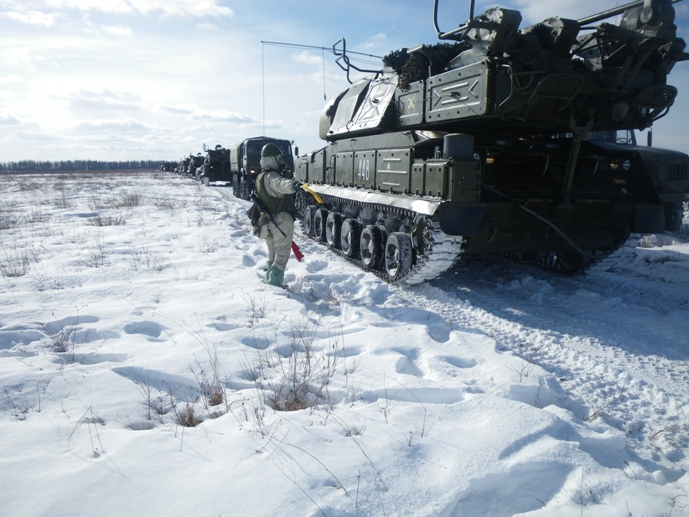
Telemba military training ground
