= Lake Dyupkun =

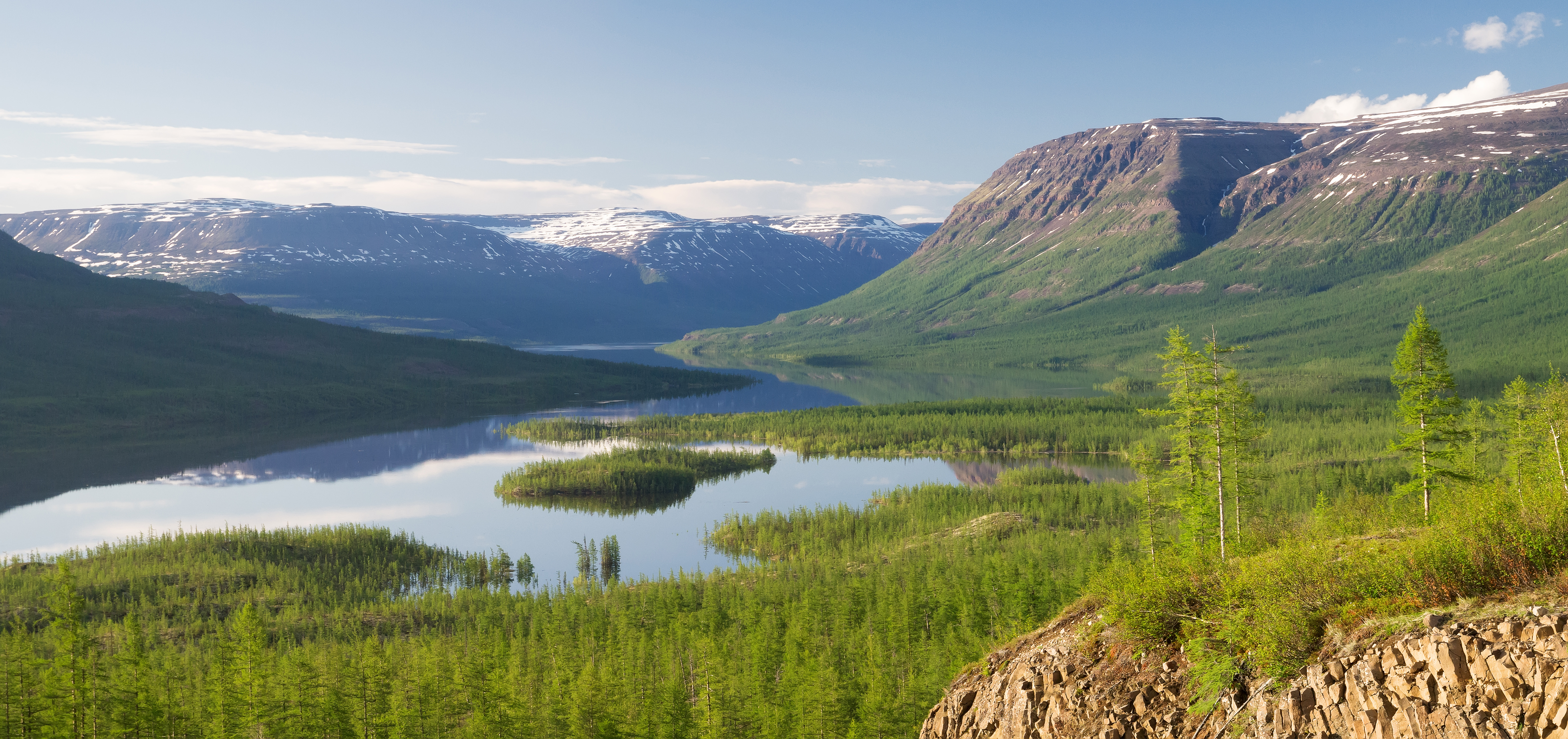

- Location within Russia
- Location: Putorana Plateau, Siberia, Russia
- Coordinates: 68.207778°N 92.770556°E
- Type: lake

Lake Dyupkun (Дюпкун) is a vast, isolated lake stretching for 90 kilometres (56 mi) in the southwest of the Putorana Plateau in Northern Siberia. The Kureika River flows through the lake from south to north. It lies on marshy ground at the bottom of a valley and has an area of 199 km^{2}. The lake's left bank is the location of the Talnikovy Waterfall, claimed to be the highest in all of Asia.

It is located southeast of Lake Khantayskoye.

== See also ==
- List of lakes of Russia
