= Ulzyte =

Ulzyte Улзытэ
- Selo
- Location within Republic of Buryatia Location within Russia
- Coordinates: 52°27′N 110°51′E
- Country: Russia
- Region: Republic of Buryatia
- District: Yeravninsky District
- Time zone: UTC+8:00

Ulzyte (Russian: Улзытэ; Buryat: Υлзытэ, Ülzyte) is a rural locality (a selo) in Yeravninsky District, Republic of Buryatia, Russia. The population was 33 as of 2010. There are 11 streets.

== Geography ==
Ulzyte is located 51 km southwest of Sosnovo-Ozerskoye (the district's administrative centre) by road. Mozhayka is the nearest rural locality.
