= Garam, Republic of Buryatia =

Garam Гарам
- Settlement
- Location within Republic of Buryatia Location within Russia
- Coordinates: 52°34′N 111°26′E
- Country: Russia
- Region: Republic of Buryatia
- District: Yeravninsky District
- Time zone: UTC+8:00

Garam (Russian: Гарам) is a rural locality (a settlement) in Yeravninsky District, Republic of Buryatia, Russia. The population was 208 as of 2010. There are 2 streets.

== Geography ==
Garam is located near the Bolshoy Yeravna lake, part of the Yeravna-Khorga Lake System. 10 km northwest of Sosnovo-Ozerskoye, the nearest rural locality.
