= Isinga (lake) =

Lake in Buryatia, Russia

- Исинга
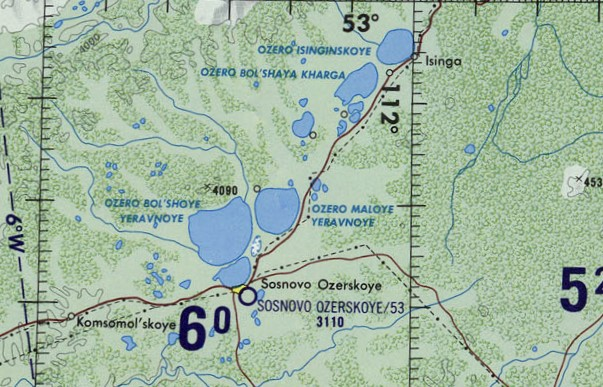
- Isinga is the northernmost large lake of the Yeravna-Khorga Lake System

- Location in Buryatia, Russian Far East
- Location: Vitim Plateau; South Siberian System
- Coordinates: 52°55′33″N 111°57′08″E
- Primary outflows: Kholoy
- Catchment area: 2,250 km^{2} (870 sq mi)
- Basin countries: Buryatia, Russia
- Surface area: 33.4 km^{2} (12.9 sq mi)
- Surface elevation: 943 m (3,094 ft)
- Frozen: October to May
- Islands: None
- Settlements: Isinga

Isinga (Russian: Исинга or Исингинское) is a fresh water body in the Yeravninsky District, Buryatia, Russia.

There are vestiges of ancient human settlements on the banks of the Isinga dating back to 4-5 thousand years ago. Archaeological excavations were carried out in 1972 at the sites of ancient settlements, providing a wealth of data in the Isinga area.

== Geography ==
Isinga lake is part of the Yeravna-Khorga Lake System (Russian: Еравно-Хоргинской системы озёр) and is the northernmost sizeable lake of the group. The system includes 6 large lakes and a number of smaller ones.

The lake has a large catchment area, 2,250 km^{2} (870 sq mi), which is largely covered by the forest steppe typical of the Vitim Plateau. Lake Khorga (or Kharga) lies very close to the southwest. The Kholoy, a small, shallow tributary of the Vitim River, flows from the eastern shore of Isinga lake. When the water levels are high the Yeravna lakes further south are connected with each other and the northern ones by intermittent channels. The outlet of the whole lake system is via the Kholoy.

== Fish ==
Isinga lake is noted for its fisheries. Perch, roach, pike and crucian carp, are among the fish species in the lake.

== See also ==
- List of lakes of Russia
