= Gunda, Republic of Buryatia =

Gunda Гунда
- Settlement
- Location within Republic of Buryatia Location within Russia
- Coordinates: 52°47′N 111°43′E
- Country: Russia
- Region: Republic of Buryatia
- District: Yeravninsky District
- Time zone: UTC+8:00

Gunda (Russian: Гунда) is a rural locality (a settlement) and the administrative centre of Gundisnkoye Rural Settlement, Yeravninsky District, Republic of Buryatia, Russia. The population was 1,093 as of 2017. There are 22 streets.

== Geography ==
Gunda is located by Gunda lake, part of the Yeravna-Khorga Lake System, 37 km northeast of Sosnovo-Ozerskoye (the district's administrative centre) by road. Khorga is the nearest rural locality.
