= Yeravna-Khorga Lake System =

Lakes of Buryatia

- Еравно-Хоргинская система озёр
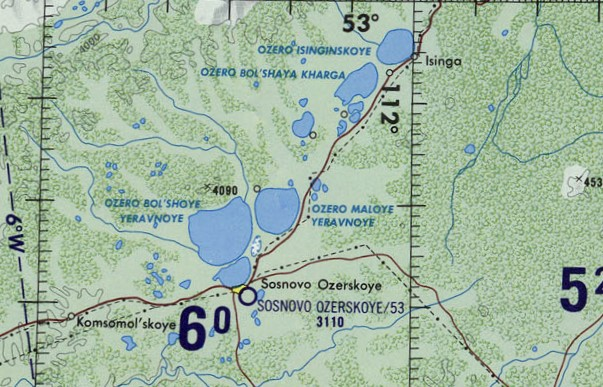
- Yeravna-Khorga Lake System map section

- Location in Buryatia, Russian Far East
- Location: Vitim Plateau, South Siberian System
- Coordinates: 52°42′N 111°32′E
- Primary outflows: Kholoy
- Basin countries: Buryatia, Russia
- Max. depth: 5 m (16 ft)
- Surface elevation: ca 950 m (3,117 ft)
- Frozen: October to May

Yeravna-Khorga Lake System (Russian: Еравно-Хоргинская система озёр) is a group of relatively shallow fresh water bodies in the Yeravninsky District, Buryatia, Russia. The villages of Isinga, Khorga, Tuldun, Gunda, Shiringa, Garam, as well as Sosnovo-Ozerskoye, the district capital, are located near the lakes.

There are fisheries of local importance in most of the lakes of the group.

== Geography ==
The lake system lies in the Yeravna Depression, at the southern end of the Vitim Plateau. It includes 6 large lakes and several smaller ones aligned in a roughly NE/SW direction for about 70 km (43 mi). The catchment area of the lake system is located in a forest steppe zone.

Bolshoye Yeravnoye (Greater Yeravna) is the largest lake of the group, followed by neighboring Maloye Yeravnoye (Lesser Yeravna). Other lakes of the system include Sosnovoye, Khaimisanov and Bolshoye Goluboye — with Goluboye and Maloye Goluboye close to it— in the southern cluster, known as "Yeravna Lakes" (Russian: Еравнинские озёра). There are many small lakes further to the southwest.

In the northern section lie Gunda, Eksend (Эксенд), Arshan, Khynter (Хынтер), Khorga and Malaya Khorga, as well as Isinga, the northernmost of the group.

=== Hydrography ===
When the water levels are high the Yeravna lakes are connected with each other by intermittent channels. The outlet of the lake area is via the Khorga lakes to the northeast through the Kholoy, a small, shallow tributary of the Vitim River flowing from Isinga lake at the northeastern end.

== See also ==
- List of lakes of Russia
- Ivan-Arakhley Lake System, a similar lake formation located about 100 km (62 mi) to the southeast, in Zabaykalsky Krai.

== Bibliography ==
- A. M. Plyusnin & E. G. Peryazeva, Hydrological and hydrochemical characteristics of the lakes in the Eravninskaya depression, 2012, DOI 10.1134/s1875372812020060
