= Telemba (lake) =

Lake in Buryatia, Russia

- Телемба / Тэлэмбэ
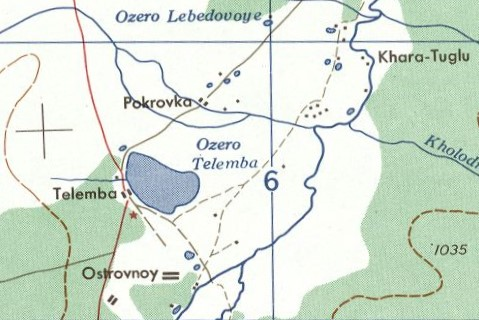
- Map section of Telemba lake and surroundings.

- Location in Buryatia, Russian Far East
- Location: Vitim Plateau; South Siberian System
- Coordinates: 52°43′48.29″N 113°18′56.12″E
- Basin countries: Buryatia, Russia
- Max. length: 3.6 km (2.2 mi)
- Max. width: 2 km (1.2 mi)
- Surface area: 5 km^{2} (1.9 sq mi)
- Surface elevation: 911 m (2,989 ft)
- Frozen: October to May
- Islands: None
- Settlements: Telemba

Telemba (Russian: Телемба; Russian Buryat: Тэлэмбэ) is a fresh water body in the Yeravninsky District, Buryatia, Russia. The lake has an area of 5 km^{2} (1.9 sq mi). Telemba village is located on the western shore of the lake.

There is a military training ground of the Eastern Military District of the Russian Armed Forces near the lake.

== Geography ==
Telemba lake is located in the Vitim Plateau. The Konda River, a tributary of the Vitim River, flows to the east and southeast of the lakeshores. There are other lakes nearby, but Telemba is the largest and most picturesque of the lakes of the Konda river basin.

== See also ==
- List of lakes of Russia
