= Tuldun =

Tuldun Тулдун
- Settlement
- Location within Republic of Buryatia Location within Russia
- Coordinates: 52°41′N 111°34′E
- Country: Russia
- Region: Republic of Buryatia
- District: Yeravninsky District
- Time zone: UTC+8:00

Tuldun (Russian: Тулдун) is a rural locality (a settlement) and the administrative centre of Tuldunskoye Rural Settlement, Yeravninsky District, Republic of Buryatia, Russia. The population was 471 as of 2017. There are 13 streets.

== Geography ==
Tuldun is located 22 km north of Sosnovo-Ozerskoye (the district's administrative centre) by road, Shiringa is the nearest rural locality, near the Maly Yeravna lake, part of the Yeravna-Khorga Lake System.
