= Talnikovy Waterfall =

Waterfall in Siberia, Russia

- Location within Krasnoyarsk Krai Location within Russia
- Location: Putorana Mountains
- Coordinates: 68°26′55″N 93°17′13″E

The Talnikovy Waterfall (Russian: Тальниковый водопад) is a 700m(2297ft) high seasonal waterfall in the Putorana Mountains, the northwestern part of the Central Siberian Plateau in the north of Siberia, Russia (Asia). With this height of fall from several cascades, it belongs to the highest Waterfalls on Earth. It is located in the Putorana Nature Reserve not far from the Lake Dyupkun.

A small brook falls from the flat summit of the Mount Trapetsia ("Trapeze") into the Talnikova River, a left tributary of the Kureika River. Its height was estimated in 1990 to be 482 meters(1581ft), although some claim that the height of the entire cascade varies from 600 to 700 meters(1969-2297ft).

== History ==
Instrumental measurements were first made in 1990 during an expedition into the mountains by Petro Krawtschuk, author of the scientific book Geographisches Kaleidoskop The eight-member expedition was led by Boris Babizki (born 1936; former USSR - athlete). A fall height of 482m was determined. The measurement result appeared in Kravchuk's book Nature's Records .

This seasonal waterfall is notoriously difficult to access and measure, since the brook is frozen each year for 10 to 11 months. Its annual reappearance is not common; every other year, the stream is not observed at all, prompting Russian geographers to dispute whether it still exists.

== See also ==
- List of waterfalls
