= Isinga =

Isinga Исинга
- Selo
- Location within Republic of Buryatia Location within Russia
- Coordinates: 52°54′N 111°59′E
- Country: Russia
- Region: Republic of Buryatia
- District: Yeravninsky District
- Time zone: UTC+8:00

Isinga (Russian: Исинга; Buryat: Иисэнгэ, Iisenge) is a rural locality (a selo) and the administrative centre of Isinginskoye Rural Settlement, Yeravninsky District, Republic of Buryatia, Russia. The population was 911 as of 2017. There are 21 streets.

== Geography ==
Isinga is located by Lake Isinga, 55 km northeast of Sosnovo-Ozerskoye (the district's administrative centre) by road. Khorga is the nearest rural locality.
