= Keta (disambiguation) =

Keta may refer to:

- Keta, a town in the Volta Region of Ghana
- Keta (Ghana parliament constituency), one of the constituencies represented in the Parliament of Ghana
- KETA, an educational television station licensed in Oklahoma City, Oklahoma, United States
- Keta Municipal District, one of the eighteen districts in the Volta Region of Ghana
- Keta salmon (Oncorhynchus keta), a species of anadromous fish in the salmon family
- Korea Electronic Travel Authorization
- Lake Keta, a large freshwater lake in Krasnoyarsk Krai, Russia
- Keta Minaj, Dutch drag queen
- Keta (Skagafjörður), a church site in Iceland
