= Labaz =

Labaz may refer to:

- Lake Labaz
- Labaz Group, a pharmaceutical company bought by the Sanofi subsidiary of Elf Aquitaine in 1973
