= Tabanda =

Lake in Sakha, Russia

- Табанда / Табандьа
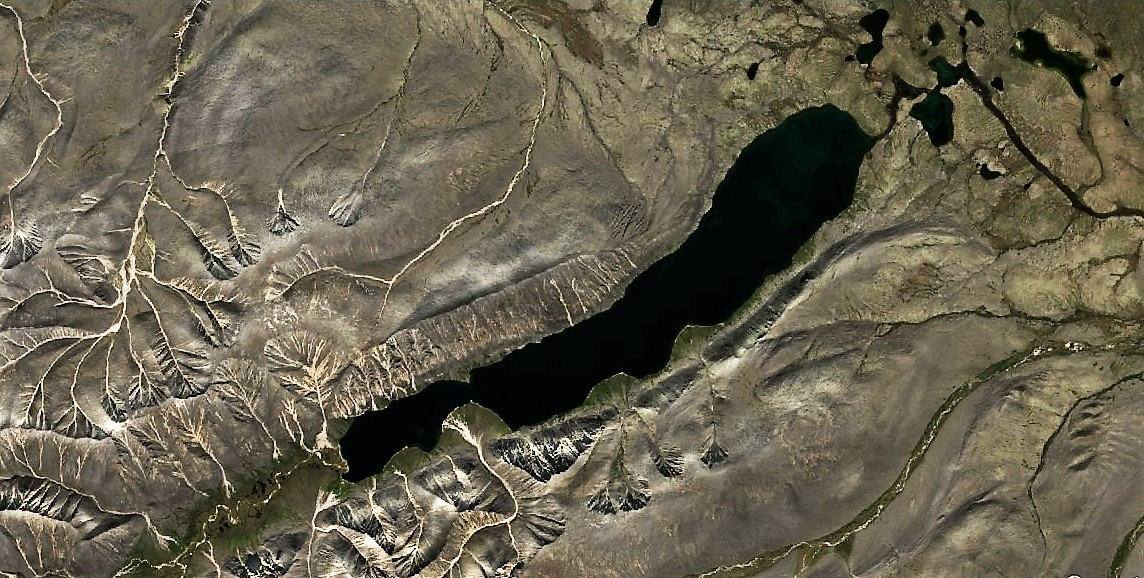
- Sentinel-2 image of the lake

- Location in Yakutia, Russian Far East
- Location: Chibagalakh Range; Chersky Range; East Siberian System
- Coordinates: 66°19′5″N 140°01′10″E
- Primary outflows: Tabanda-Seene River
- Catchment area: 125 km^{2} (48 sq mi)
- Basin countries: Yakutia, Russia
- Max. length: 10 km (6.2 mi)
- Max. width: 1.4 km (0.87 mi)
- Surface area: 11.2 km^{2} (4.3 sq mi)
- Surface elevation: 1,239 m (4,065 ft)
- Frozen: October to June

Tabanda (Russian: Табанда; Yakut: Табандьа, Tabanca) is a freshwater lake in the Moma District, Sakha Republic (Yakutia), Russia.

It is one of the largest Alpine lakes of the Chersky Range system and is located in a desolate mountainous area where there are few visitors despite the beauty of the landscapes.

== Geography ==
Lake Tabanda is a glacial lake that lies among high mountains at 1,239 m (4,065 ft) above mean sea level in the basin of the Chibagalakh River, part of the Indigirka basin. It is located at the head of the river in the northern slopes of the Chibagalakh Range.

The Tabanda-Seene (Табанда-Сээнэ) river is the outflow of the lake. After its confluence with the Kanelibit, it gives origin to the Chibagalakh, a left hand tributary of the Indigirka.

== See also ==
- List of lakes of Russia
- Indigirka River
