= Chibagalakh =

- Mouth location in Yakutia, Russia
- Native name: Чыбаҕалаах (Yakut)

Location
- Federal subject: Yakutia, Russia

Physical characteristics
- Source
  - location: Confluence of Tabanda-Seene and Kanelibit rivers, Chibagalakh Range
  - elevation: 2,150 m (7,050 ft)
- Mouth: Indigirka
  - coordinates: 65°46′34″N 142°48′46″E
  - elevation: 297 m (974 ft)
- Length: 140 km (87 mi)
- Basin size: 9,100 km^{2} (3,500 sq mi)

Basin features
- Progression: Indigirka→ East Siberian Sea

The Chibagalakh (Russian: Чибагалах; Yakut: Чыбаҕалаах, romanized: Çıbağalaax) is a river in the Republic of Sakha in Russia. It is a left hand tributary of the Indigirka. It is 140 kilometres (87 mi) long, with a drainage basin of 9,100 square kilometres (3,500 mi^{2}).

Grayling, whitefish and lenok are found in the waters of the river.

== Course ==
The Chibagalakh River begins at the confluence of the Tabanda-Seene (Табанда-Сээнэ) and Kanelibit rivers in the Chibagalakh Range of the Chersky Range. It heads roughly eastwards through a valley located between the Chemalgin Range on the northern side and the Chibagalakh Range on the southern. Finally it joins the left bank of the Indigirka 1,184 km (736 mi) from its mouth.

The river usually freezes in early October and stays frozen until late May or early June. Lake Tabanda's outflow is a right hand tributary of the river.

== See also ==
- List of rivers of Russia
