= Lake Beloye (Ryazan Oblast) =

Lake in Klepikovsky District, Ryazan Oblast, Russia

- Russian: Озеро Белое (English: "White Lake")
- IUCN category III (natural monument or feature)
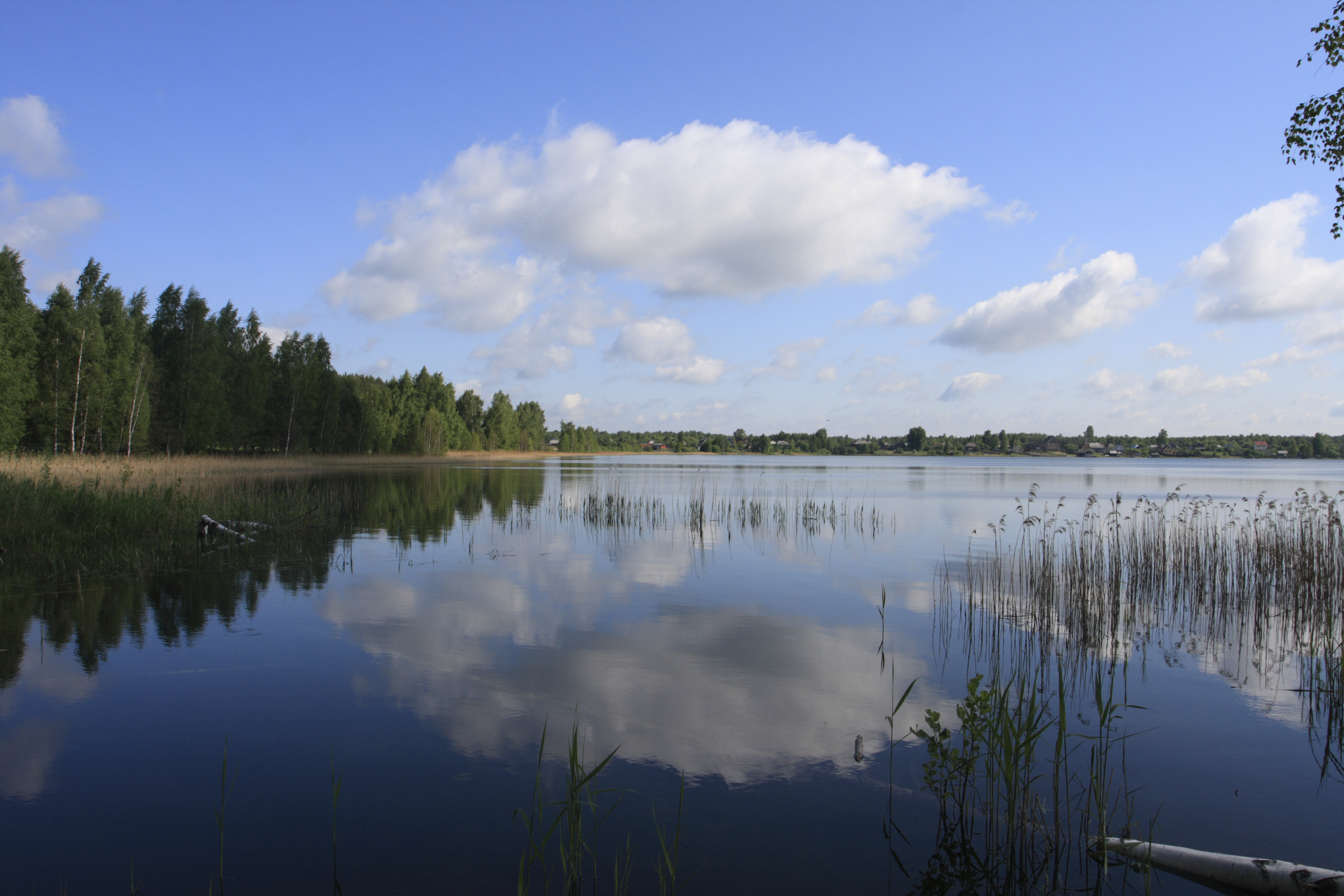
- The Northwestern shore of the lake

- Location within European Russia Location within Russia
- Location: Ryazan
- Nearest city: Spas-Klepiki
- Coordinates: 55°16′50″N 40°14′0″E
- Area: 34 hectares (84 acres; 0 sq mi)
- Established: 1974
- Governing body: Meshchyorsky National Park
- Lake Beloye
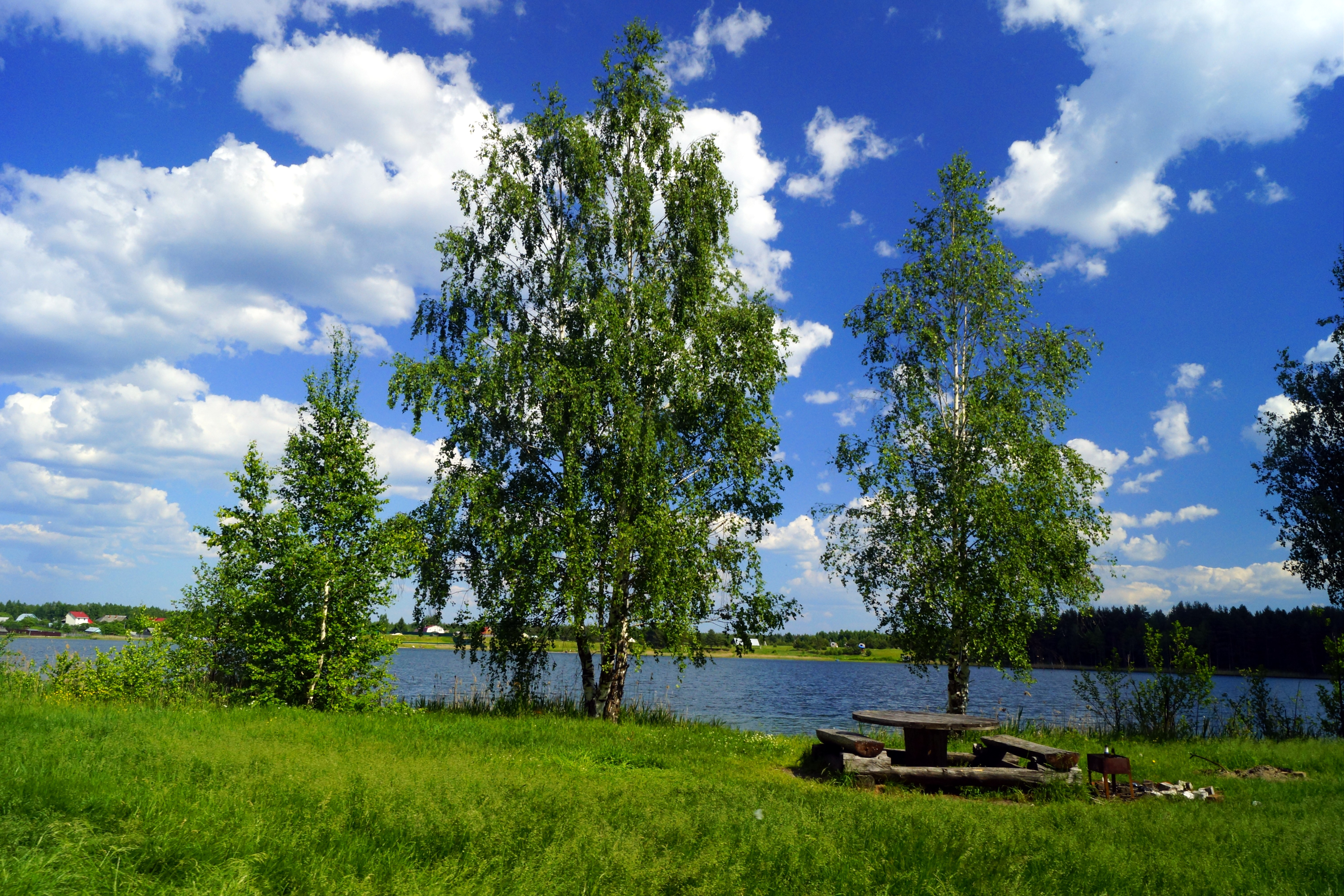
- Picnic area, Lake Beloye, Rayazan Oblast

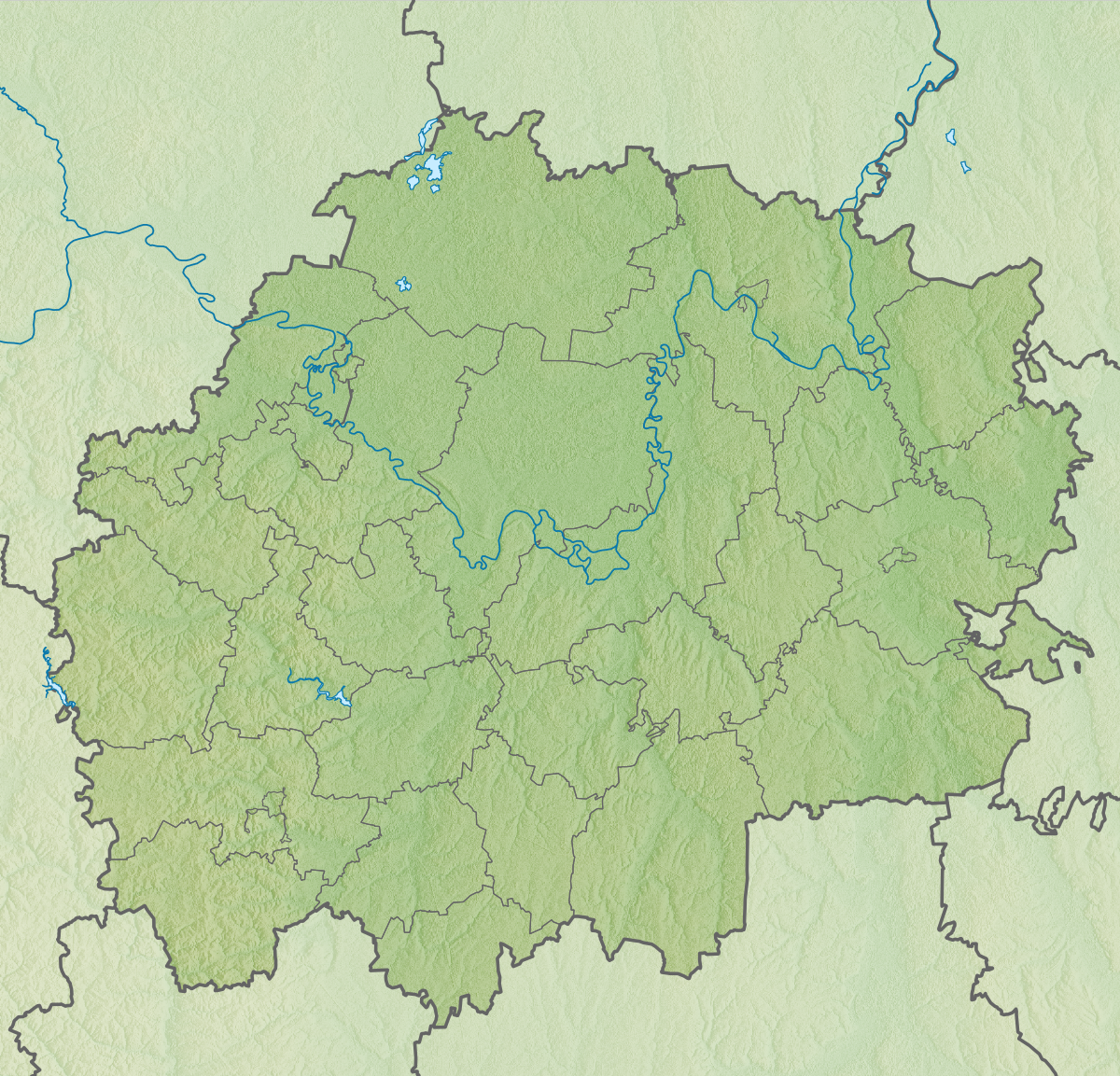
- Location within Ryazan Oblast
- Coordinates: 55°16′50″N 40°14′0″E
- Surface area: 34 ha (84 acres)
- Max. depth: 50 m (160 ft)
- Shore length^{1}: 2.2 km (1.4 mi)
- ^{1} Shore length is not a well-defined measure.

Lake Beloye (Russian: Бе́лое о́зеро, IPA: [ˈbʲɛləjə ˈozʲɪrə] — literally White lake) is a lake in Klepikovsky District, Ryazan Oblast, Russia. It is notable for its relatively great depth for the region - 50 metres (160 ft) - created as a deep gouge in the landscape in the most recent glaciation. The lake is located in the Meshchyera Lowlands, a glacial alluvial plain of swampy lowlands, gravelly moraines and limestone bedrock. It was once connected by an artificial canal to Lake Velikoye ("Grand Lake", a much larger lake with a surface area of 20 square kilometres (7.7 mi^{2})). The canal was filled in 2009. Lake Beloye is surrounded by pine forests, with reeds and sedge predominating on the shore. It is a popular lake for recreation and fishing, being home to pike, carp and other fish.

Lake Beloye was classified in 1974 as a "Nature Monument of Regional Importance", for its "scientific, cultural, educational and health" value (World Database of Protected Places ID #206212). The site records the presence several species listed as vulnerable in the Red Book of Russia, including the Viviparous lizard, the reptile living the farthest north. It is part of Meshchersky National Park.

== See also ==
- List of lakes in Russia
- Meshchersky National Park
