= Konda (Vitim) =

River in southern East Siberia, Russia

Konda Конда
- Mouth location in Buryatia, Russia

Location
- Country: Russia
- Federal subject: Buryatia

Physical characteristics
- Source: Yablonoi Mountains; South Siberian System
  - coordinates: 52°15′46″N 112°12′07″E
- Mouth: Vitim
  - coordinates: 53°29′44″N 113°32′16″E
  - elevation: 802 m (2,631 ft)
- Length: 285 km (177 mi)
- Basin size: 10,400 km^{2} (4,000 sq mi)
- Discharge
  - average: 23 m^{3}/s (810 cu ft/s)

Basin features
- Progression: Vitim→ Lena→ Laptev Sea

The Konda (Russian: Конда) is a river in Buryatia, southern East Siberia, Russia. It is 285 kilometres (177 mi) long, and has a drainage basin of 10,400 square kilometres (4,000 sq mi). There are a few inhabited places close to the banks of the river, including Tselinny, Konda, Telemba and Alekseevka in the Yeravninsky District.

The Konda is a river rich in fish. Tourists regularly visit the area for fishing and watersports. There is a military training ground of the Russian Armed Forces Eastern Military District 1 km (0.62 mi) to the west of the left bank of the river in the area of Telemba village.

== Course ==
The Konda is a right tributary of the Vitim. Its sources are in the small Khudan Range, west of Chita. It flows across mountainous terrain between the northern section of the Yablonoi Mountains and the Chersky Range. The river flows first in a northeastern direction and then bends gradually meandering northwards in a floodplain with about 500 lakes. The largest and most picturesque is Telemba. Finally the Konda meets the Vitim 1,397 kilometres (868 mi) from its mouth in the Lena.

The longest tributaries of the Konda are the Ursa, Mongoi, Ushmun and Ilkolyu on the right, and the Kumka on the left. The river is frozen between the second half of October and early May. It can have fluctuations in the water level in summer and autumn. There is patchy distribution of permafrost in the basin.

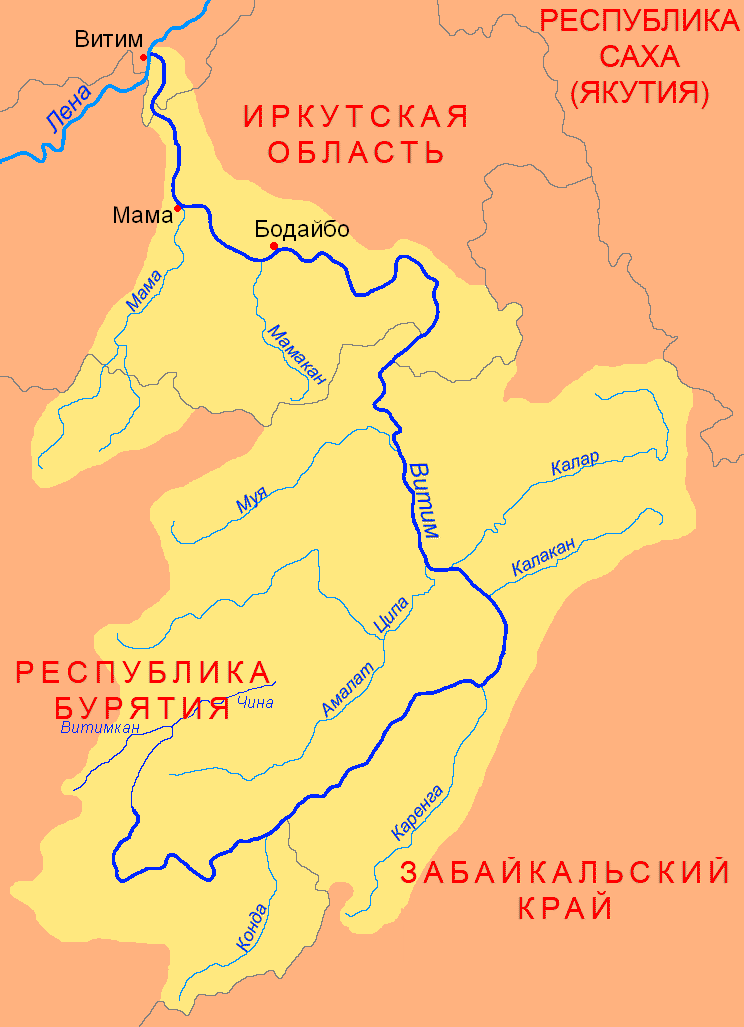
Basin of the Vitim with the Konda in the lower part.

== See also ==
- List of rivers of Russia
