= Lake Krasnoye (Leningrad Oblast) =

Lake in Leningrad, Russia

- Красное озеро (Russian)
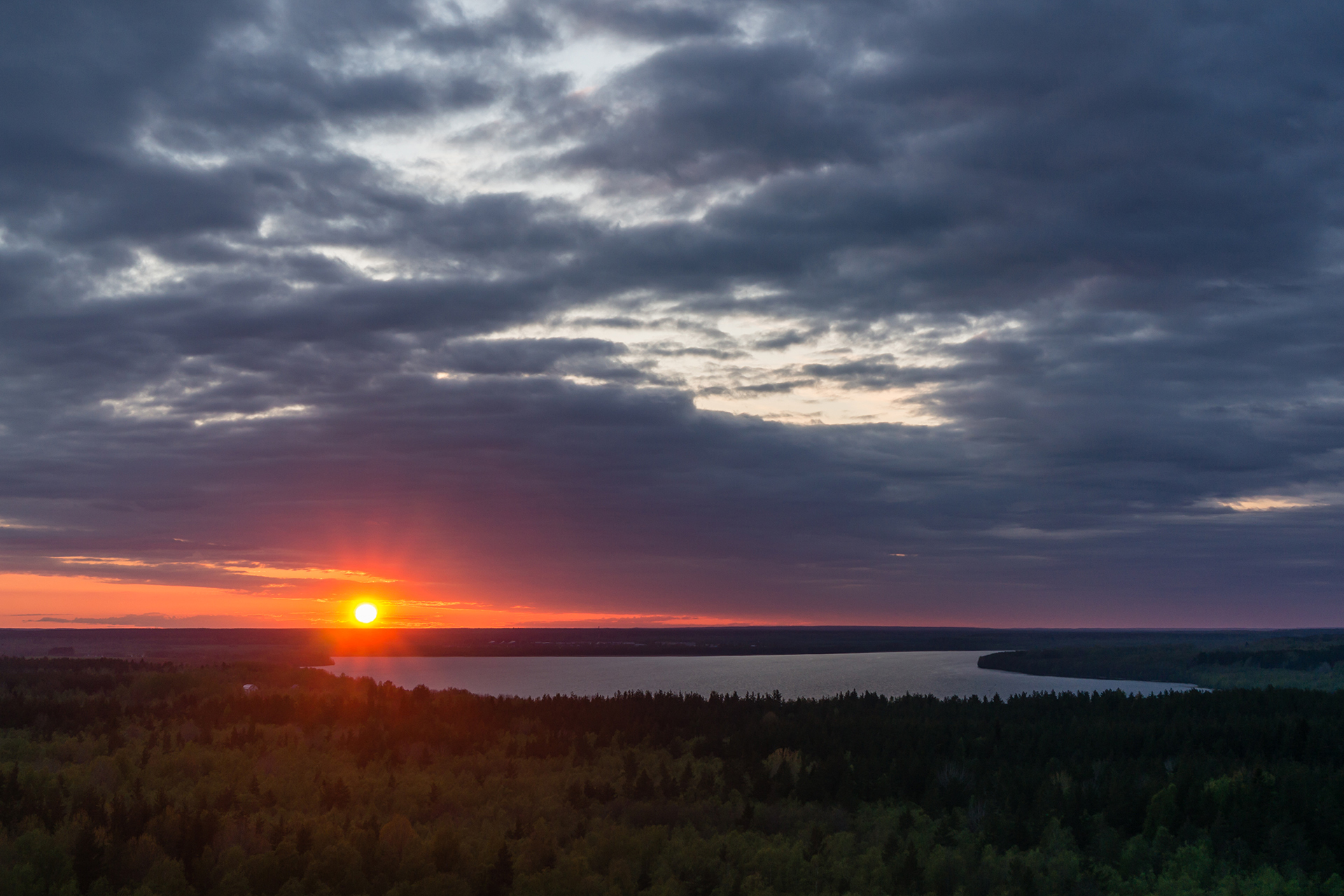

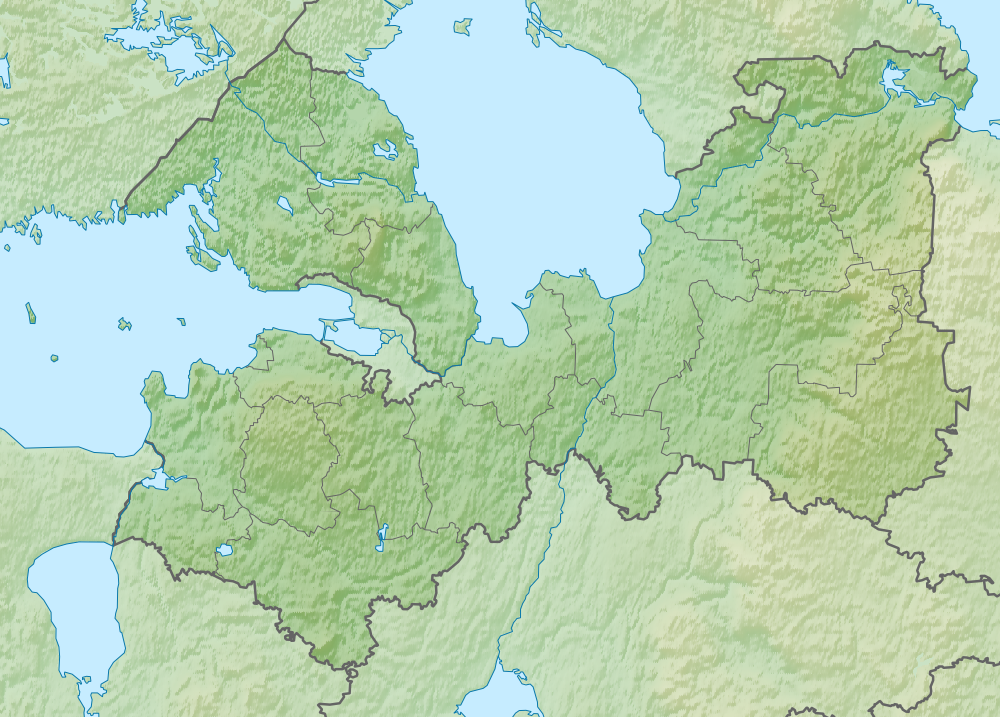
- Location within European Russia Location within Leningrad Oblast
- Location: Leningrad Oblast
- Coordinates: 60°33′N 29°42′E
- Basin countries: Russia
- Max. length: 6.9 km (4.3 mi)
- Max. width: 2.8 km (1.7 mi)
- Surface area: 9 km^{2} (3.5 sq mi)

Lake Krasnoye (Russian: Красное озеро, literally Red Lake, before 1948 Punnusjärvi, Finnish: Punnusjärvi) is a lake in Priozersky District of Leningrad Oblast, near Korobitsyno.

== Geography ==
The lake is located in the central part of the Karelian Isthmus and belongs to the River Vuoksi drainage basin. It is a 6.9 km by 2.8 km lake and its area is about 9 km^{2}.

== See also ==
- List of lakes of Russia
