= Meshchyorsky National Park =

National park in Russia

- Мещерский, Meshchersky
- IUCN category II (national park)
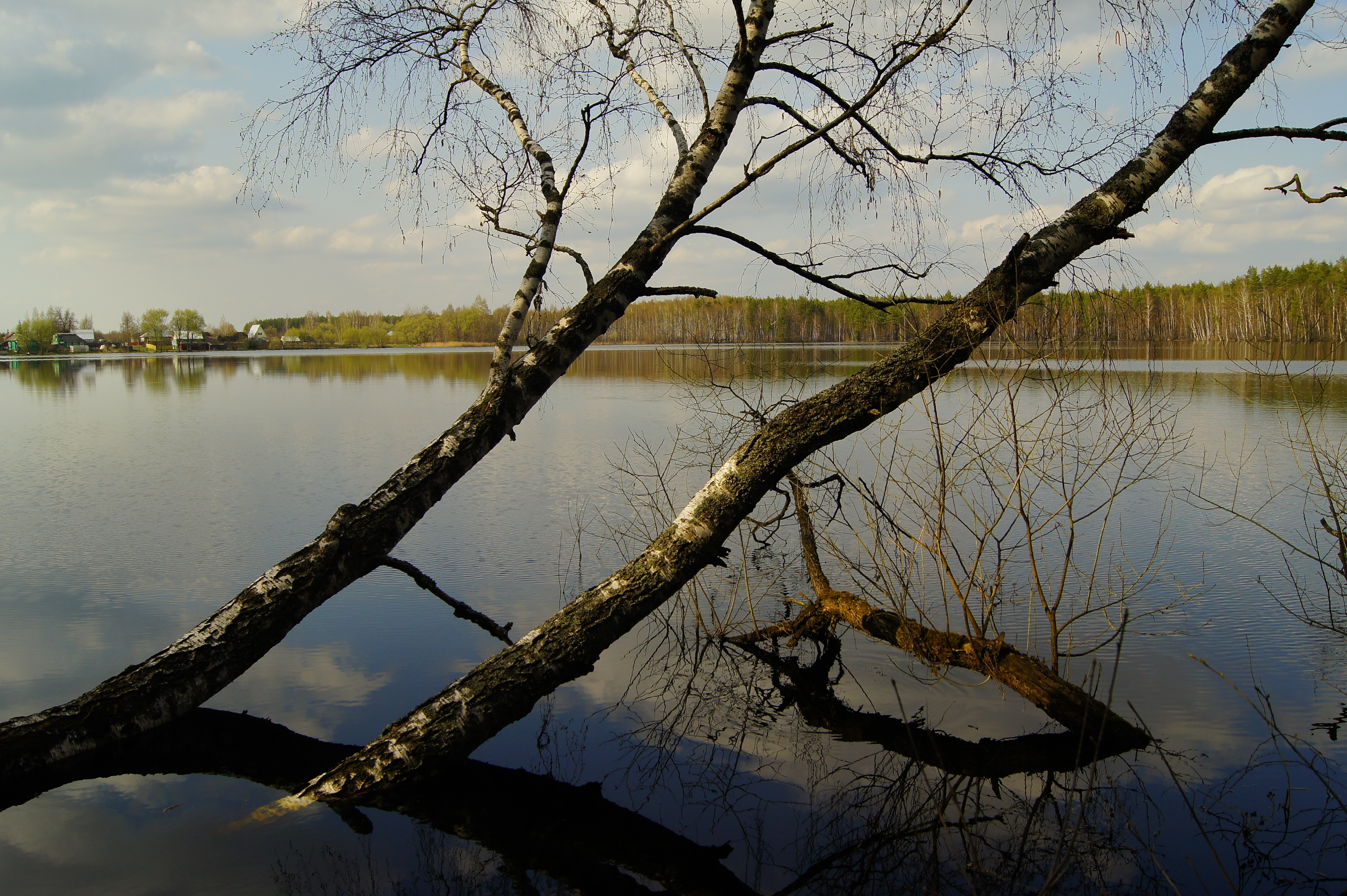
- Meshchyorsky National Park

- Location within Russia
- Location: Ryazan Oblast
- Nearest city: Ryazan
- Coordinates: 55°08′N 40°10′E
- Area: 6,621 hectares (16,361 acres; 66 km^{2}; 26 sq mi)
- Established: 1992
- Governing body: FGBU "Meshchyorsky"
- Website: http://sovka.narod.ru/7.html

Meshchyorsky National Park (Russian: Национальный парк «Мещерский») covers extensive wetlands (swamps, peat bogs, rivers and lakes) and pine/birch woodlands in the Meshchera Lowlands on the East European Plain in the northern section of Ryazan Oblast, Russia, about 120 km east of Moscow. The wetland habitat provides for extremely rich biodiversity among the plants and animals. "Meshchersky" (Мещёрский) National Park is not to be confused with "Meshchyora" (Мещёра) National Park, which is just to the north, over the border in Vladimir Oblast. The park protects a section of the Pra River, Lake Beloye ("White Lake"), and associated wetlands and forests. About 54% of the park territory is used and managed for agricultural purposes by local communities.

Meshcheyorsk National Park forms a portion of the "Oka and Pra River Floodplains" wetland site under the Ramsar Convention (Ramsar ID #167), as a wetland of international importance.

== Topography ==
Meshchyora is located in a flat, ancient alluvial valley formed during the Quaternary Period as the Oka and Dnieper glaciers (and the Moscow glacier on the northwest edge of the park), receded and left a glaciofluvial cover. The Pra River watershed contains small rivers (including the Buzh and the Pol), streams, and a 48 km chain of lakes interconnected by channels. The lakes are shallow (under 1.1 meters at low water), with marshland along the shores. The largest lakes are Lake Velikoye, which has an open water area of 20.7 km2, Lake Dubovoye (12.2 km2) and Lake Martynovo (2.46 km2). At the confluence of the Pra and Oka rivers, the floodplain is 10 km wide.

The altitude of land in the park ranges only 40 meters vertically, from 80 to 120 meters above sea level. The wetlands experience floods in the spring, and low-water levels and dryness during the summer dry season. As with most national parks in Russia, the territory is zoned for different uses and levels of protection. By the 1995 zoning plan, Meshchyorsky is laid out for the following:

- Zone of Strict Protection: 20.1 thousand hectares (19.8%)
- Ecological Restoration: 50.8 thousand hectares (49.3%)
- Traditional Economic Activities: 29.4 thousand hectares (28.6%)
- Recreation and Visitor Services: 2.7 thousand hectares (2.6%)
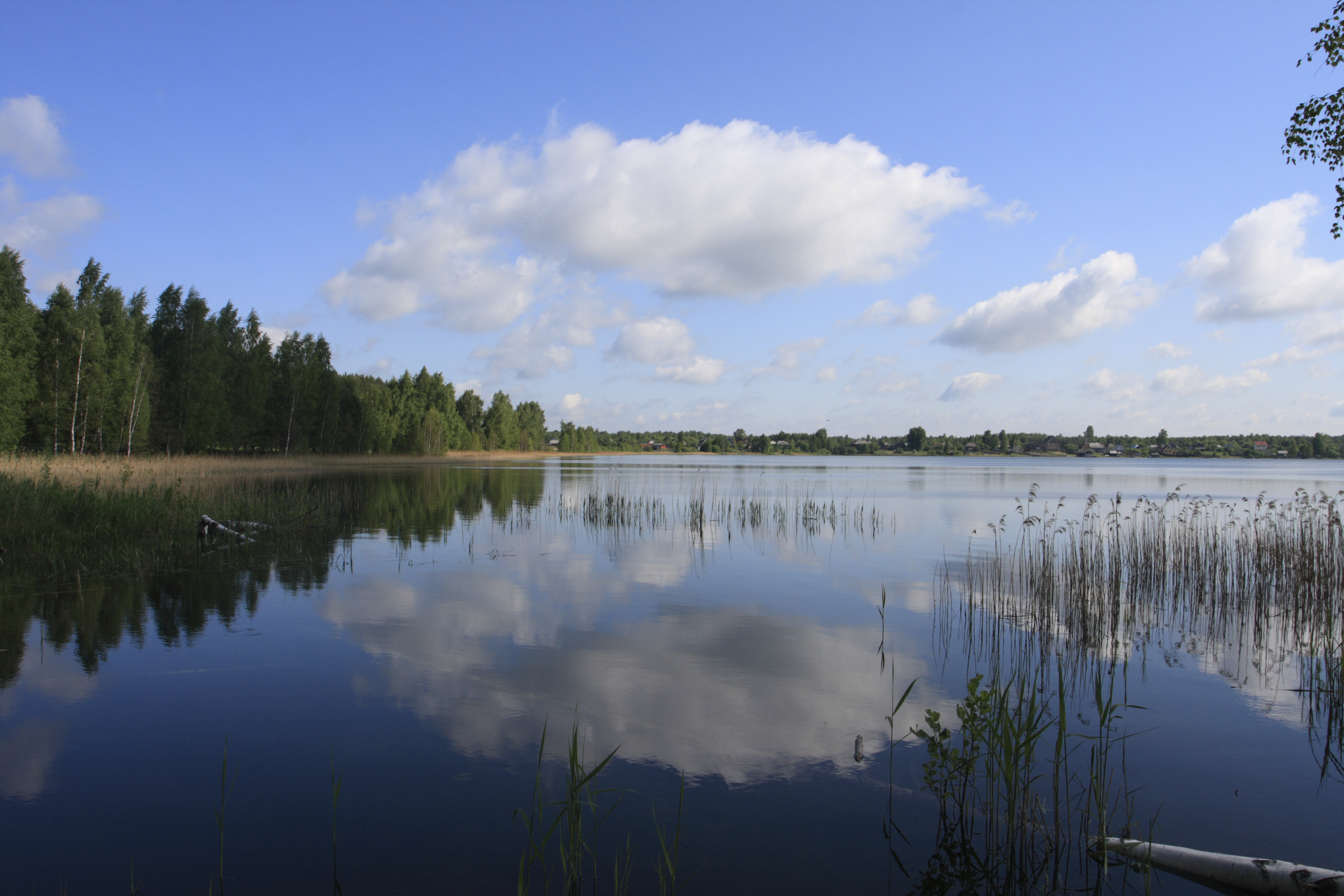
Lake Beloye ("White Lake"), northern Ryazan Oblast

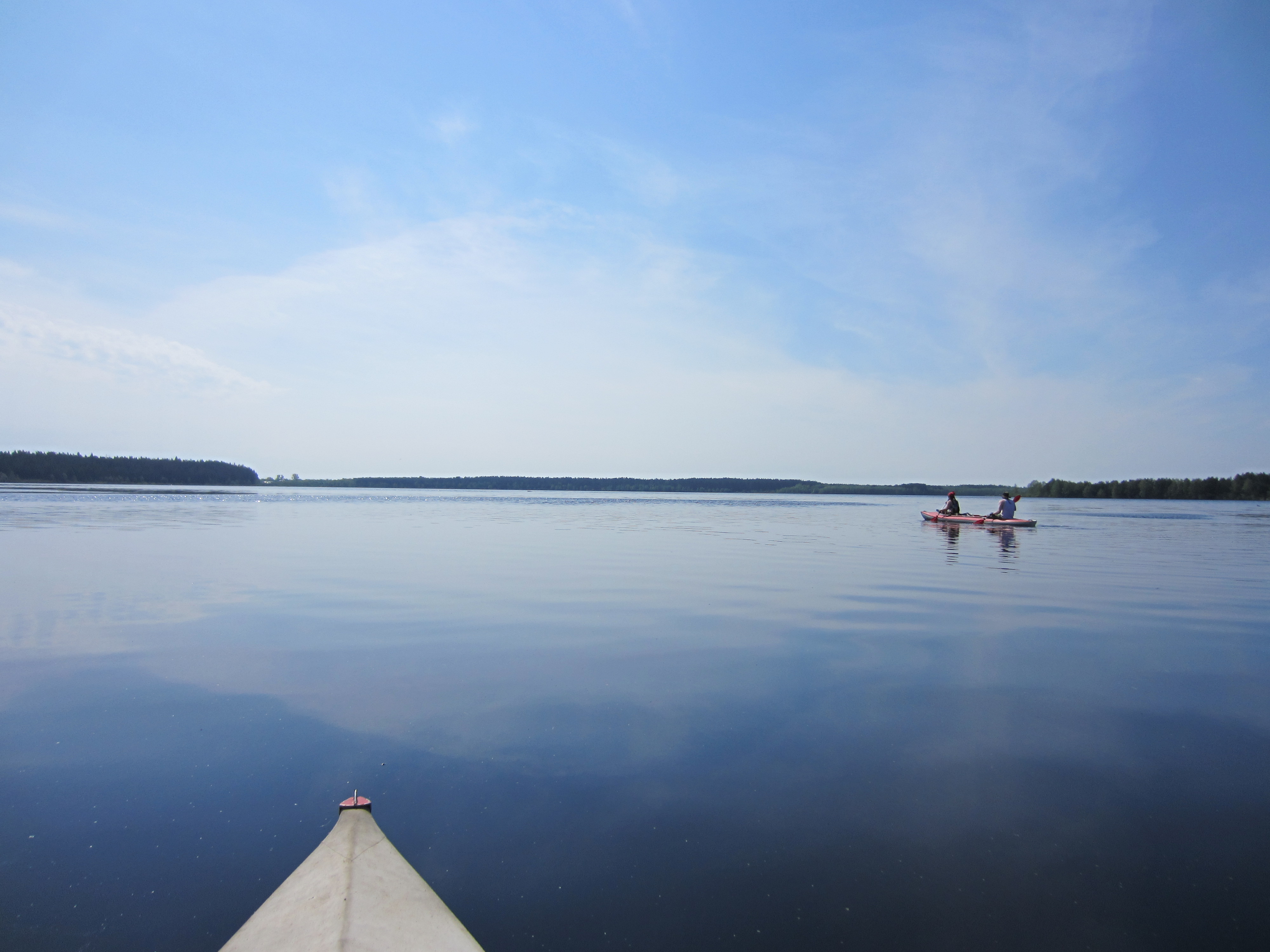
Lake Sokorevo, on the Pra River

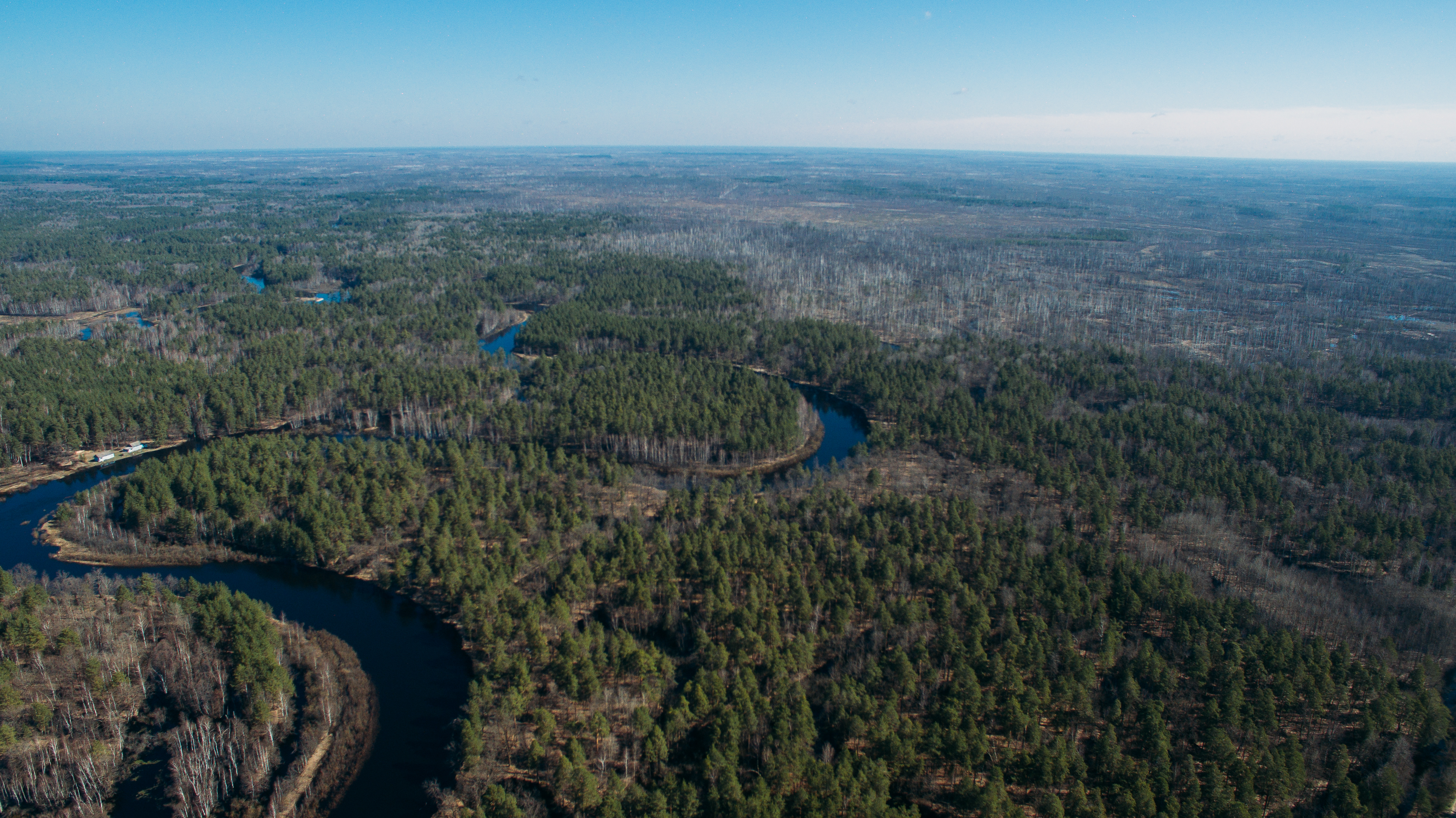
Aerial view of a portion of the park

== Ecoregion and climate ==
The park is in the Sarmatic mixed forests ecoregion, a band of temperate mixed forests that stretches from Norway to the Ural Mountains. The climate of Meshchyorsky is moderate continental (Köppen climate classification Dfb), characterized by four distinct seasons, high variance between winter and summer temperatures, long winters, and short, warm and rainy summers. Average temperatures range from 14 F in January to 68 F in July. Annual precipitation averages 23 inches.

Ryazan, Ryazan Oblast, Russia

Climate chart (precipitation, max. and min. temperature)
J	F	M	A	M	J	J	A	S	O	N	D
1.4 20 7	1.1 21 8	1 32 18	1.5 51 35	1.9 67 47	2.4 74 54	3.4 76 57	2.2 73 54	2.1 62 45	2 47 35	1.9 33 24	1.7 25 15
- █ Average max. and min. temperatures in °F
- █ Precipitation totals in inches
- Source: climate-date.org
Metric conversion
J	F	M	A	M	J	J	A	S	O	N	D
36 −7 −14	28 −6 −13	25 0 −8	38 11 2	48 19 8	61 23 12	86 25 14	56 23 12	53 17 7	51 9 2	48 0 −5	43 −4 −10
- █ Average max. and min. temperatures in °C
- █ Precipitation totals in mm

== Plants ==
The forested areas are dominated by pine where the soils are sandy. On less sandy ground, the tree cover is mostly birch, aspen, alder, and some spruce. As land is being taken out of agriculture, man-made meadows are developing with high sedge and eventually secondary forest. Scientists have identified 866 species of vascular plants in the park, of which 47 are classified as vulnerable.

== Animals ==
As the park is on the southern edge of the taiga, there are some large mammals such as elk, wild boar, and recently brown bear along the forest edges. Beavers are growing rapidly in number, along with muskrat, in the lakes and canals. In spring, migratory birds arrive in large numbers, particularly geese and ducks, with wading birds in the marshes. Many fish from the Oka River system move through the parks to the lakes, including perch, pike, chub, bream, roach, and others. Vulnerable animals include the greater noctule bat.

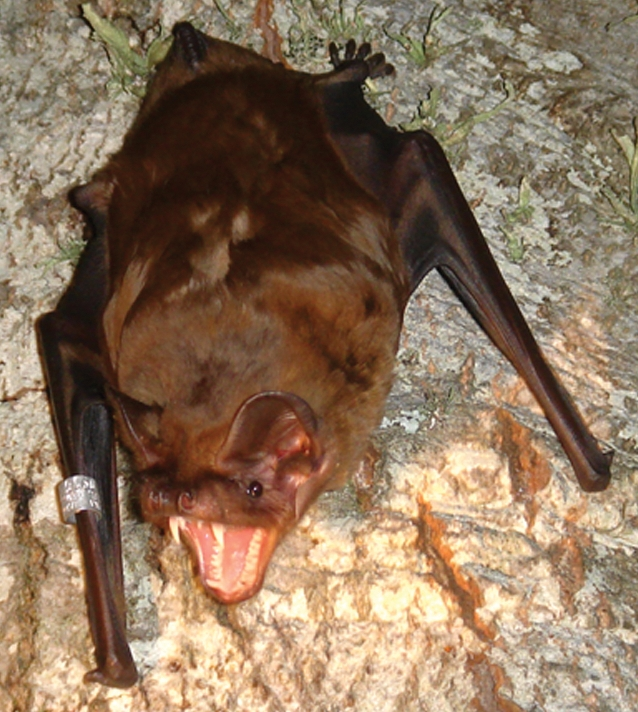
Greater noctule bat (near threatened)

== History ==
The Russian painter Abram Arkhipov lived in a village in the territory and painted extensively of the peasant life of the area in the late 1800s. The Russian Soviet writer Konstantin Paustovsky also lived in the area, writing about the natural surroundings of Meshchersky.

Forest fires and peat fires are a recurring danger to Meshcheyora park. Many of the areas are quite dry during the summer, and the areas with underlying peat - a natural fuel - burn readily. To address this, the park is upgrading the water levels in the park and increasing the use of modern fire-fighting equipment and techniques. The Russian report on Ramsar wetlands noted in 2015 that "The Meshchora National Park (neighboring to the Floodplains of the Oka and Pra Rivers Ramsar site) has been implementing a long-term peatland restoration programme since 2003. Over 6,000 ha of degraded peatlands were rewetted by 2015."

== Tourism ==
The park is highly popular for outdoor recreation - hiking, cycling, camping, boating, fishing, collecting berries and mushrooms, etc. The park strongly emphasizes ecological education, with children's camps, festivals, and scientific participation.

== See also ==
- Protected areas of Russia
- 2010 Russian wildfires
