= Omuk-Kyuyol =

Lake in Yakutia, Russia

- Омук-Кюёль / Омук-күөлэ
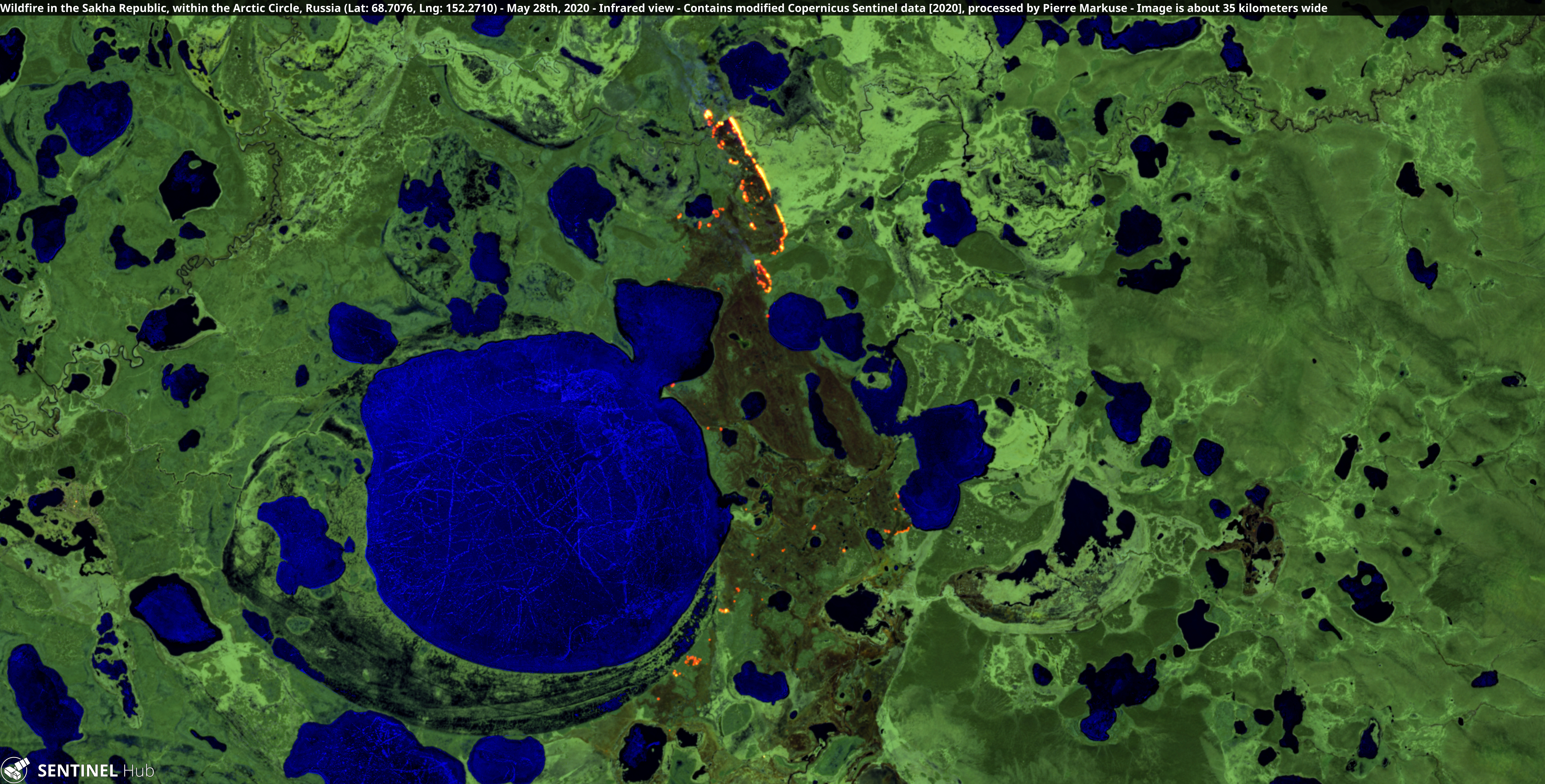
- Omuk-Kyuyol Sentinel-2 image

- Location in the Sakha Republic, Russian Far East
- Location: Kolyma Lowland
- Coordinates: 68°40′N 152°08′E
- Primary outflows: Omuk-Kyuyol-Seen
- Catchment area: 258 square kilometres (100 mi^{2})
- Basin countries: Russia
- Max. length: 11 km (6.8 mi)
- Max. width: 9 km (5.6 mi)
- Surface area: 53.5 square kilometres (20.7 mi^{2})
- Frozen: October to June
- Islands: None

Omuk-Kyuyol or "Omuk-Kyuyel" (Russian: Омук-Кюёль or Омук-Кюель; Yakut: Омук-күөлэ, Omuk-küöle) is a freshwater lake in the Sakha Republic (Yakutia), Russia.

The nearest inhabited place is Andryushkino, Lower Kolyma District, located about 100 km (62 mi) to the northeast.

== Geography ==
Omuk-Kyuyol lies north of the Arctic Circle, in the southwestern part of the Kolyma Lowland. It is located in a large area of lakes between the basin of the Indigirka to the west and the Alazeya to the east. The main outflowing river is the Omuk-Kyuyol-Seen (Омук-Кюёль-Сээн), a small tributary of the 129-kilometre-long (80 mi) Bulgunnakhtaakh-Seene of the Alazeya basin.

== See also ==
- List of lakes of Russia
