= Lake Keta =

Lake in the country of Russia

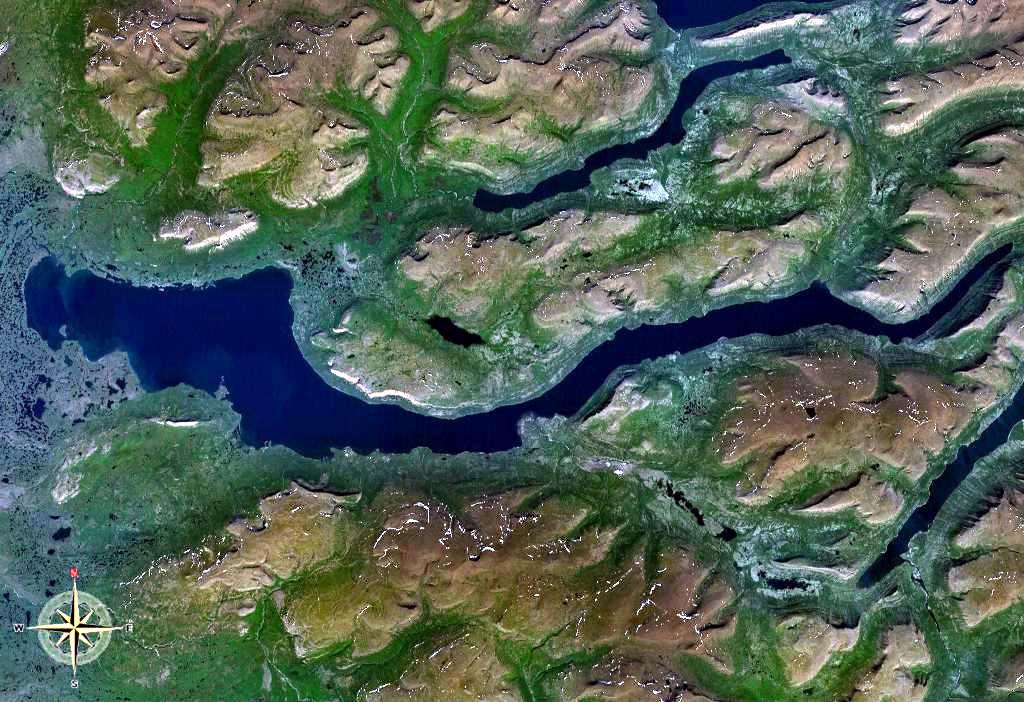
- from space

- Location in Russia Lake Keta (Krasnoyarsk Krai)
- Location: Krasnoyarsk Krai
- Coordinates: 68.6897°N 90.4386°E
- Primary outflows: Rybnaya River
- Basin countries: Russia
- Surface area: 452 km^{2} (175 sq mi)
- Average depth: 80 m (260 ft)
- Max. depth: 180 m (590 ft)

Lake Keta (Russian: Кета) is a large freshwater lake in Krasnoyarsk Krai, north-central part of Russia.

== Geography ==
Lake Keta is located in the Putorana Plateau area at 68.6897°N 90.4386°E. It has an area of 452 km^{2}. The Rybnaya River flows from the lake.

It is located south of Lake Lama and north of Lake Khantayskoye.

== See also ==
- List of lakes of Russia
