= Lake Nerpichye (Sakha Republic) =

Lake in the Sakha Republic of Russia

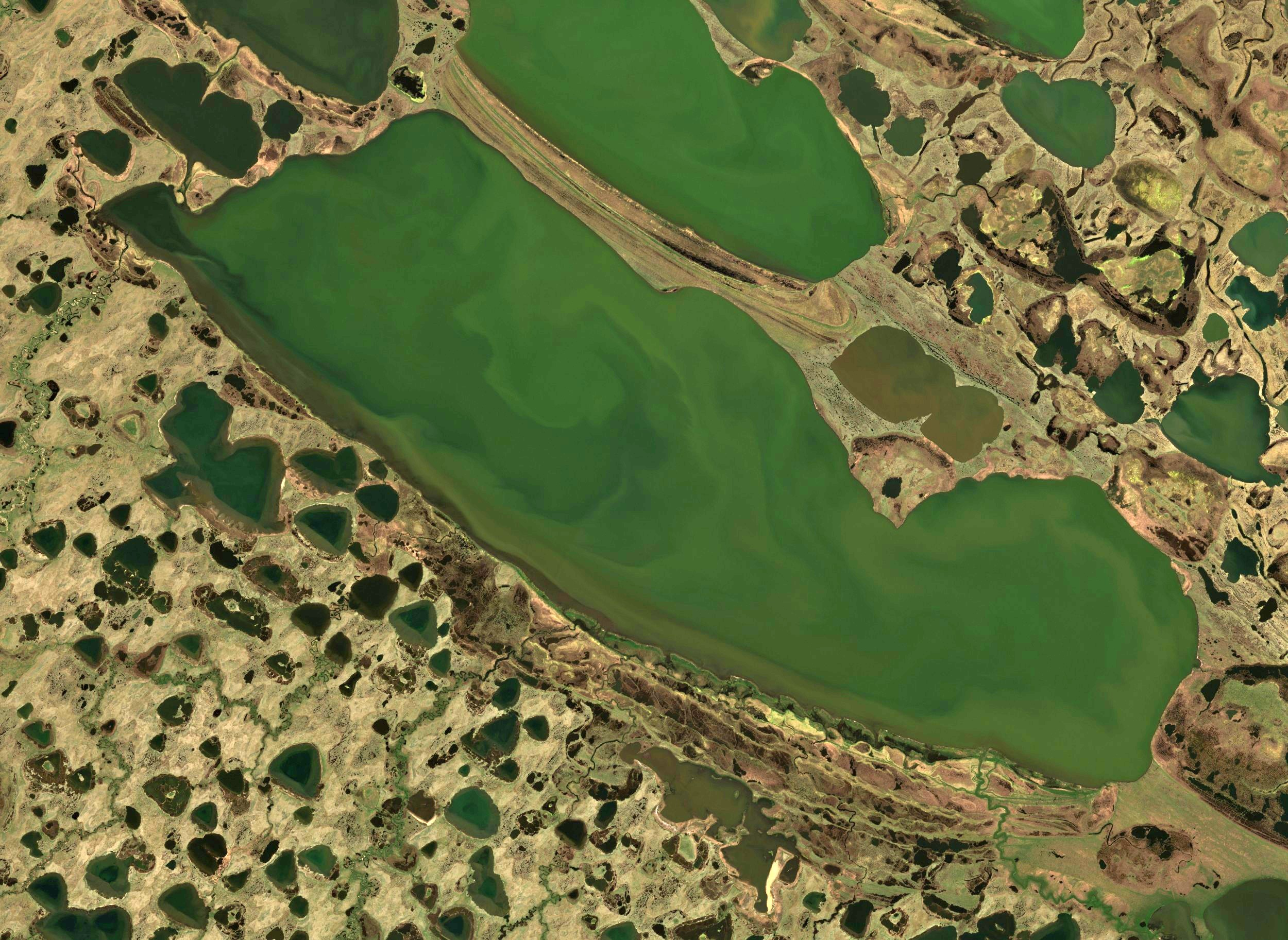

- Location within Sakha Republic
- Location: Sakha Republic, Russia
- Coordinates: 69°17′N 160°8′E
- Basin countries: Russia
- Surface area: 237 km^{2} (92 sq mi)

Lake Nerpichye (Russian: Нерпичье озеро; Yakut: Нерпалаах, Nerpalaax) is a lake in the Sakha Republic of Russia. It is located in the Kolyma Lowland, south of lake Chukochye.

== See also ==
- List of lakes of Russia
