= Lake Nerpichye (Kamchatka Krai) =

Lake in Kamchatka Krai, Russia

- Location within Kamchatka Krai
- Location: Kamchatka Krai, Russia
- Coordinates: 56°24′N 162°38′E
- Basin countries: Russia
- Surface area: 552 km^{2} (213 sq mi)

Lake Nerpichye (Russian: Нерпичье) is a lake in the Kamchatka Krai of Russia.

== Etymology ==
It has its name Nerpichye from the Russian word Нерпа (nerpa), which means so much like (fresh water) poetry. The Turkish word Kultuchnoye means lagoon.
