= Kureyka =

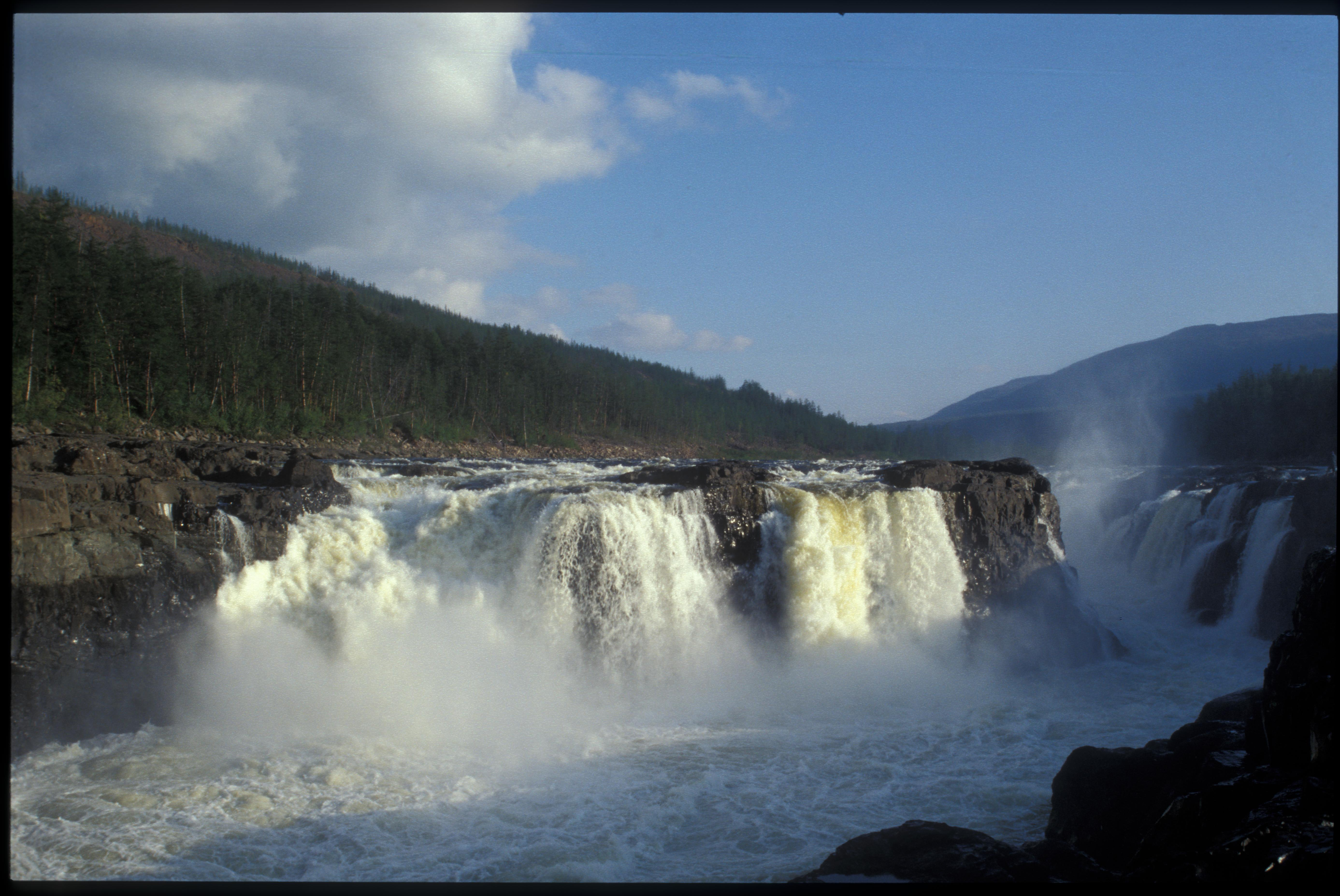
- The cataracts in the Putorana Nature Reserve

Location
- Country: Russia

Physical characteristics
- Mouth: Yenisey
  - coordinates: 66°29′18″N 87°14′08″E
- Length: 888 km (552 mi)
- Basin size: 44,700 km^{2} (17,300 sq mi)

Basin features
- Progression: Yenisey→ Kara Sea

The Kureyka (Russian: Курейка; also Lyuma, Numa) is a major right tributary of the Yenisey in Krasnoyarsk Krai, Russia.

It falls from the Putorana Plateau to the vast taiga plain of Northern Siberia and flows northward passing through a series of elongated lakes, including the Yadun, Anama, and Dyupkun lakes. It is 888 kilometres (552 mi) long. The river drains an area of about 44,700 square kilometres (17,300 mi^{2}). Its valley forms the northern boundary of the Tunguska Plateau. At the confluence, the Kureyka is more than 1,000 metres (3,300 ft) wide.

The Kureyka basin is very sparsely populated. The village of Kureyka used to have a museum dedicated to Joseph Stalin, who was exiled there in 1914–17. The Kureyskaya Hydroelectric Station was built in 1975–2002. It is served by the people from Svetlogorsk, Krasnoyarsk Krai, a townlet sitting just above the Kureyka Reservoir. Plans for another power station somewhere downstream are under consideration.

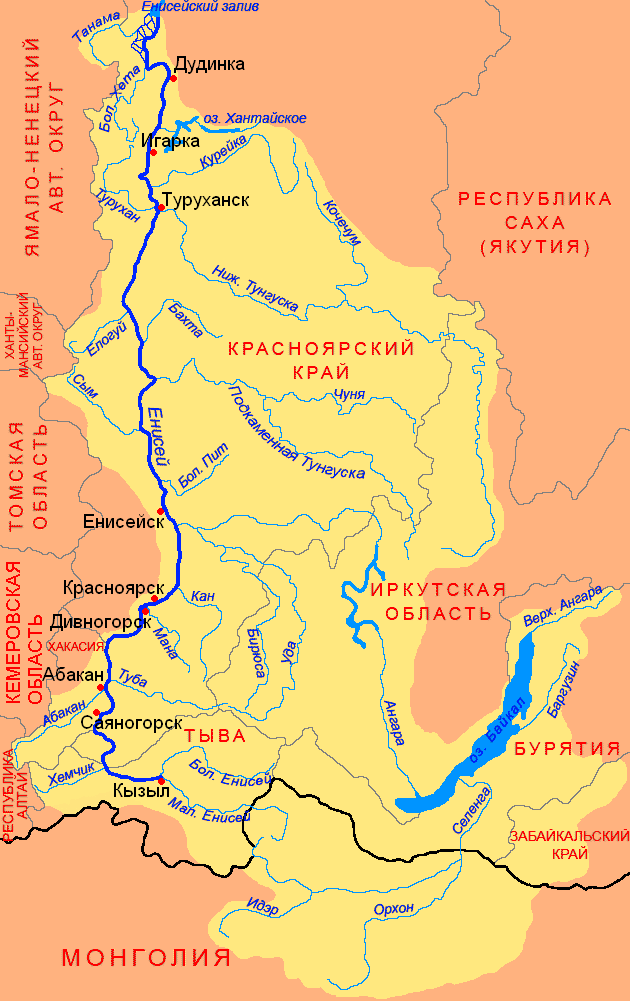
Basin of the Yenisey

== See also ==
- List of rivers of Russia
