= Lake Khantayskoye =

Lake in Krasnoyarsk Krai, Russia

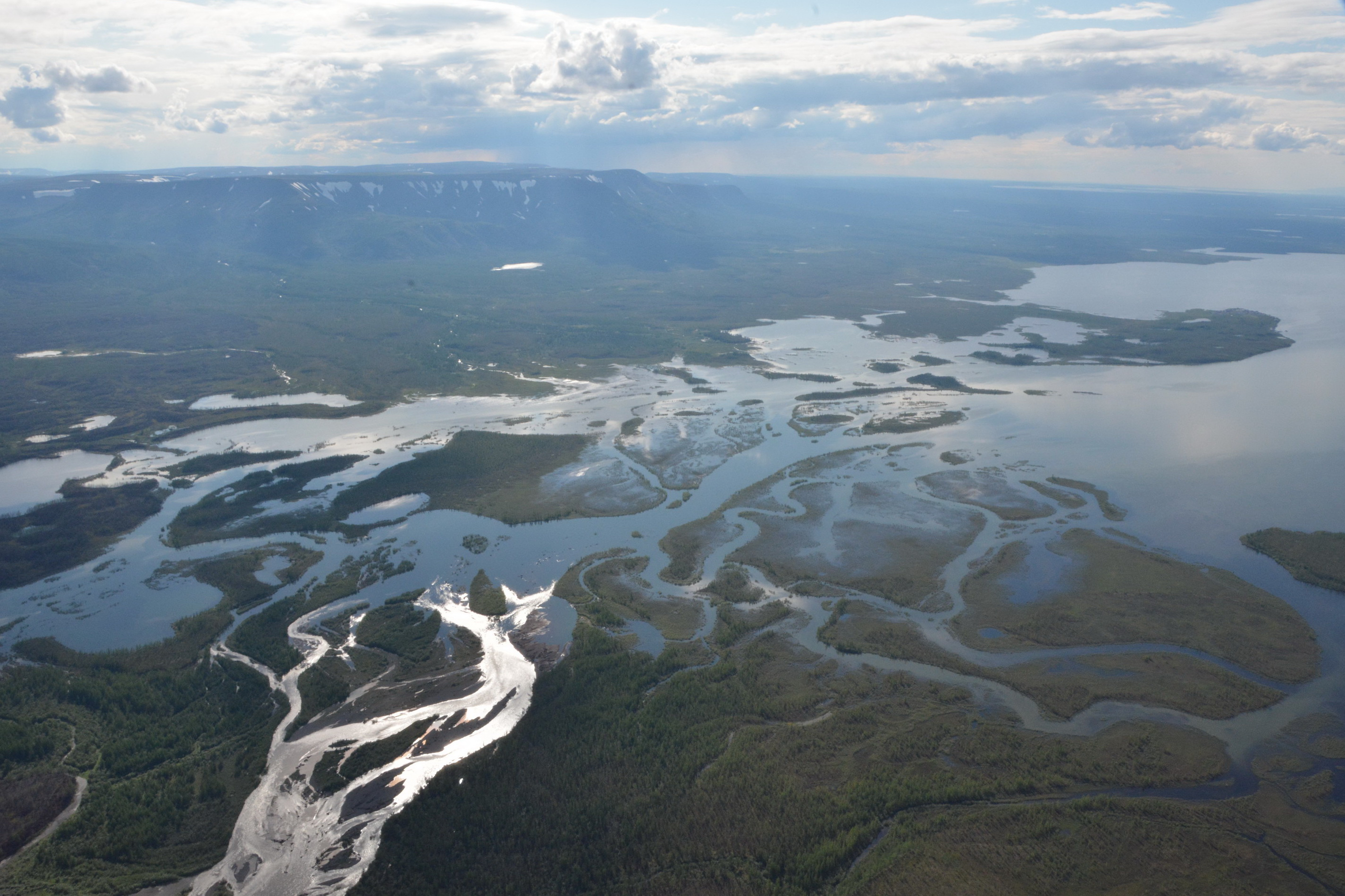

- Location in Russia Lake Khantayskoye (Krasnoyarsk Krai)
- Coordinates: 68°20′N 91°00′E
- Catchment area: 11,984 km^{2} (4,627 sq mi)
- Basin countries: Russia
- Max. length: 80 km (50 mi)
- Max. width: 25 km (16 mi)
- Surface area: 822 km^{2} (317 sq mi)
- Average depth: 74 m (243 ft)
- Max. depth: 420 m (1,380 ft)
- Water volume: 60 km^{3} (14 cu mi)
- Shore length^{1}: 610 km (380 mi)
- Surface elevation: 66 m (217 ft)
- Frozen: October to June
- Settlements: none
- ^{1} Shore length is not a well-defined measure.

Lake Khantayskoye (Russian: Хантайское озеро) is a lake in Krasnoyarsk Krai, Russia.

It is located south of Lake Keta.

== See also ==
- List of lakes of Russia
