= List of lakes of Russia =

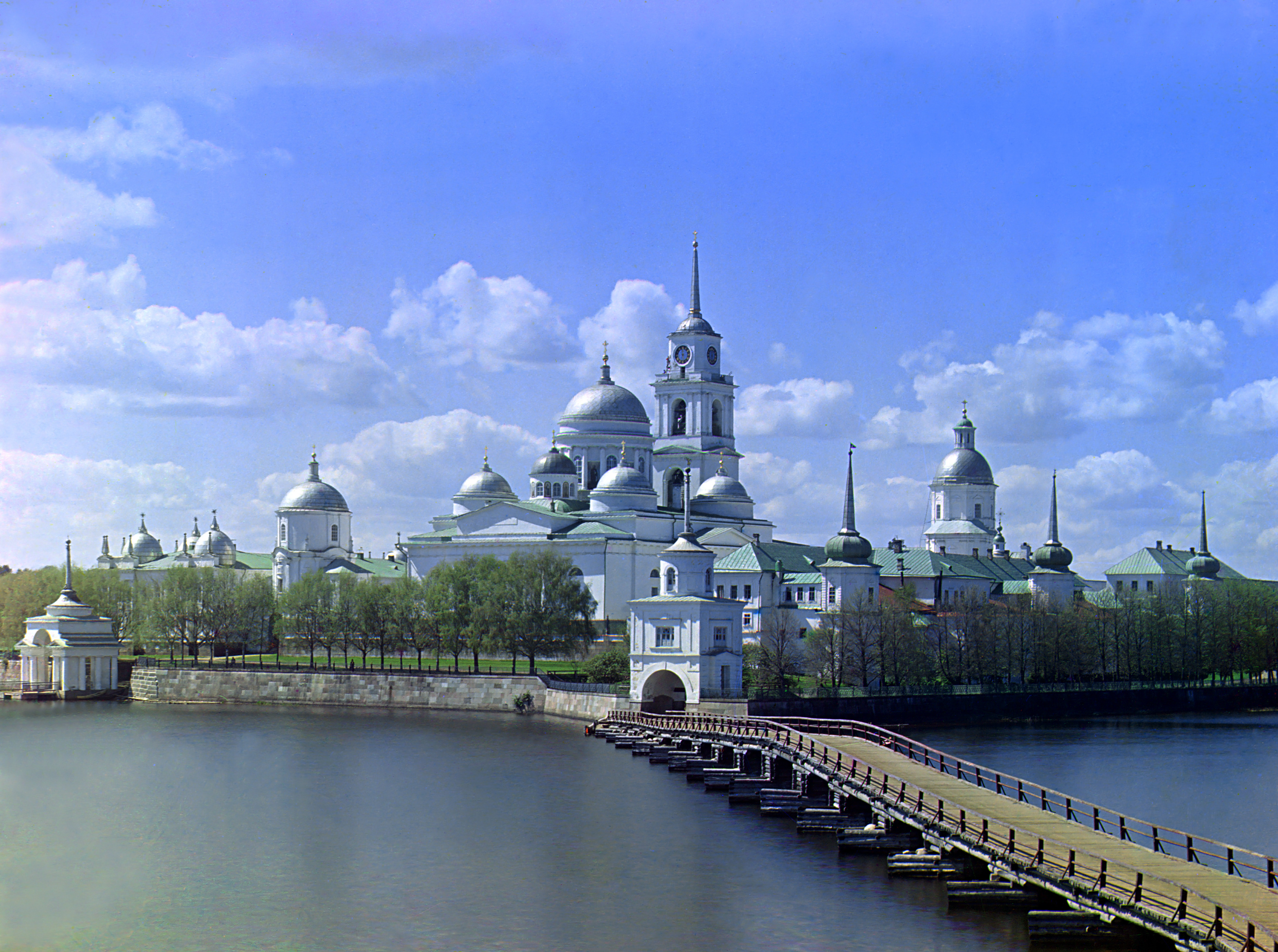
View of Lake Seliger near Ostashkov in 1910.

List of lakes in Russia in alphabetical order:

- Achchyon (Аччён)
- Akush (Акуш)
- Arakhley (Арахле́й)
- Astrodym (Астродым)
- Baikal (Байкал)
- Bakhmatovskoye (Бахматовское)
- Baunt (Баунт)
- Bauzhansor (Баужансор)
- Belenkoye (Беленькое)
- Belenkoye (Беленькое)
- Beloye, Ryazan Oblast (Белое)
- Beloye, Vologda Oblast (Белое)
- Bokon (Бокон)
- Bolshoy Bagan (Большой Баган)
- Bolshoy Yeravna (Большо́е Ера́вное)
- Bolshoye Morskoye (Большое Морское)
- Bolshoye Ostrovnoye (Большое Островное)
- Bolshoye Shklo (Большое Шкло)
- Bolshoye Toko (Большое Токо)
- Bolshoye Topolnoye (Большое Топольное)
- Bolshoye Yarovoye (Большое Яровое)
- Botkul (Боткуль)
- Brosno (Бросно)
- Bura (Бура)
- Burlinskoye (Бурлинское)
- Busani (Бусани)
- Bustakh (Бустах)
- Caspian Sea (Каспийское море)
- Chagan (Чаган)
- Chany (Чаны)
- Chukchagir (Чукчагирское)
- Chyortovo (Чёртово)
- Dorong (Доронг)
- Dzhira (Джира)
- Lake Dynda (Дында)
- Ebeyty (Эбейты)
- Ekityki (Экитыки)
- Elgygytgyn (Эльгыгы́тгын)
- Emanda (Эмандьа)
- Ervynaygytgyn (Эрвынайгытгын)
- Evoron (Эвopон)
- Eyik (Эйик)
- Filatovo (Филатово)
- Gorkiye Kilty (Горькие Кильты)
- Gorkoye (Горькое)
- Gorkoye (Горькое)
- Gorkoye (Горькое)
- Gorkoye (Горькое)
- Gorkoye (Горькое)
- Gorkoye (Горькое)
- Gorkoye-Peresheyechnoye (Горькое-Перешеечное)
- Gornostalevo (Горносталево)
- Ilirney (Илирней)
- Ilmen (Ильмень)
- Imandra (Имандра)
- Inder (Индерь)
- Ioni (Иони)
- Isinga (Исинга)
- Istikhed (Истихед)
- Itkul (Иткуль)
- Ivan-Arakhley Lake System (Ивано-Арахлейские озёра)
- Jack London (Озеро Джека Лондона)
- Kapylyushi (Капылюши)
- Kargan (Карган)
- Kenon (Кенон)
- Keta (Кета)
- Kezanoi (Кезеной-Ам)
- Khanka (Ханка)
- Khantayskoye (Хантайское)
- Khorosheye (Хорошее)
- Khummi (Хумми)
- Kizi (Кизи)
- Koolen (Коолень)
- Krasnoye, Leningrad Oblast (Красное)
- Krasnoye, Chukotka (Красное)
- Krivaya Puchina (Кривая Пучина)
- Kronotskoye (Кроноцкое)
- Kubenskoye (Кубенское)
- Kuchuk (Кучукское)
- Kulunda (Кулундинское)
- Labaz (Лабаз)
- Ladoga (Ладожское)
- Lama (Лама)
- Lovozero (Ловозеро)
- Malinovoye (Малиновое)
- Maloye Yarovoye (Малое Яровое)
- Maly Yeravna (Малое Еравное)
- Malye Chany (Малые Чаны)
- Maynits (Майниц)
- Medvezhye (Chukotka Autonomous Okrug) (Медвежье)
- Medvezhye (Kurgan Oblast) (Медвежье)
- Mostovoye (Мостовое)
- Nedzheli (Нидили)
- Neito (Нейто)
- Nero (Неро)
- Nerpichye (Нерпичье)
- Nichatka (Ничатка)
- Numto (Нумто)
- Omuk-Kyuyol (Омук-Кюёль)
- Onega (Онежское)
- Orel (Орель)
- Oron (Орон)
- Orotko (Оротко)
- Ozhogino (Ожогино)
- Petukhovo (near Severka) (Петухово)
- Petukhovo (near Petukhi) (Петухово)
- Pleshcheyevo (Плещеево)
- Peipus (Чудско-Псковское)
- Pekulney (Пекульнейское озеро)
- Peschanoye (Песчаное)
- Peschanoye (Песчаное)
- Pyakuto (Пякуто)
- Pyasino (Пясино)
- Pychgynmygytgyn (Пычгынмыгытгын)
- Sargul (Саргуль)
- Segozero (Сегозеро)
- Seliger (Селигер)
- Shalkar-Yega-Kara (Шалкар-Ега-Кара)
- Shchekulduk (Щекулдук)
- Shukyrtuz (Шукыртуз)
- Siverga (Сиверга)
- Soluntakh (Солунтах)
- Sredneye (lake, Altai Krai) (Среднее)
- Studyonoye (Студёное)
- Suringda (Сурингда)
- Suturuokha (Сутуруоха)
- Svetloyar (Светлояр)
- Syamozero (Сямозеро)
- Tabanda (Табанда)
- Taimyr (Таймыр)
- Tandovo (Тандово)
- Tavolzhan (Таволжан)
- Telemba (Телемба)
- Teletskoye (Телецкое)
- Tenis (Тенис)
- Topozero (Топозеро)
- Tytyl (Тытыль)
- Ubinskoye (Убинское)
- Uguy (Угуй)
- Ulakhan-Kyuel (Улахан кюэль)
- Uryum (Урюм)
- Uvs Nuur (Увс Нуур)
- Valdayskoye (Валдайское)
- Vistytis (Виштынецкое озеро)
- Vivi (Виви)
- Yanragytgyn (Янрагытгын)
- Yanranaygytgyn (Янранайгытгын)
- Yeravna-Khorga Lake System (Еравно-Хоргинская система озёр)
- Yessey (Ессей)
- Zerkalnoye (Зеркальное)
- Zhigilda (Жигилда)
- Zyuratkul (Зюраткуль)

== Top 10 largest ==
1. Lake Baikal, 31,722 km²
2. Lake Ladoga, 17,891 km²
3. Lake Onega, 9,891 km²
4. Lake Taymyr, 4,560 km²
5. Lake Khanka, 4,070 km²
6. Lake Peipus, 3,555 km²
7. Lake Chany, 1,700 km²
8. Lake Vygozero, 1,250 km²
9. Lake Beloye, 1,130 km²
10. Lake Topozero, 986 km²
