= Lake Labaz =

Freshwater lake in Krasnoyarsk Krai, north-central part of Russia

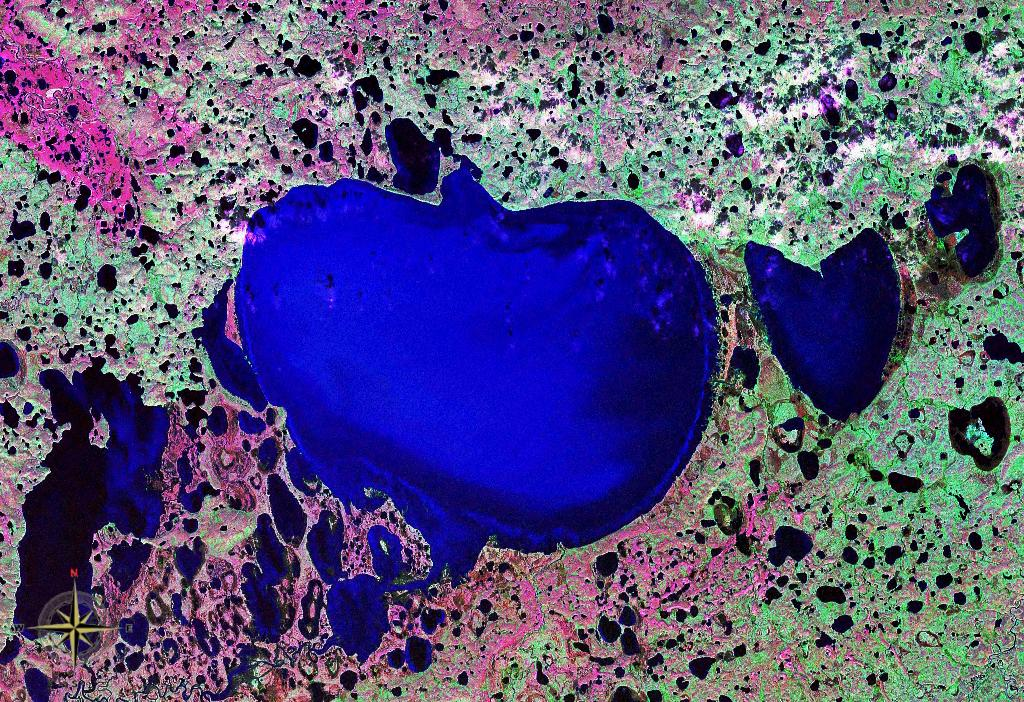
- from space (false color)

- Location in the Krasnoyarsk Krai, Russia
- Location: Krasnoyarsk Krai
- Coordinates: 72°17′42″N 99°36′19″E
- Primary outflows: Kegerdi River
- Catchment area: 1,259 km^{2} (486 sq mi)
- Basin countries: Russia
- Surface area: 470 km^{2} (180 sq mi)

Lake Labaz (Russian: Лабаз) is a large freshwater lake in Krasnoyarsk Krai, north-central part of Russia. It is located at 72°17′42″N 99°36′19″E, northwest of the Khatanga River and the Anabar Plateau. The lake has an area of 470 km^{2} (180 mi^{2}). The Kegerdi River flows from the lake.

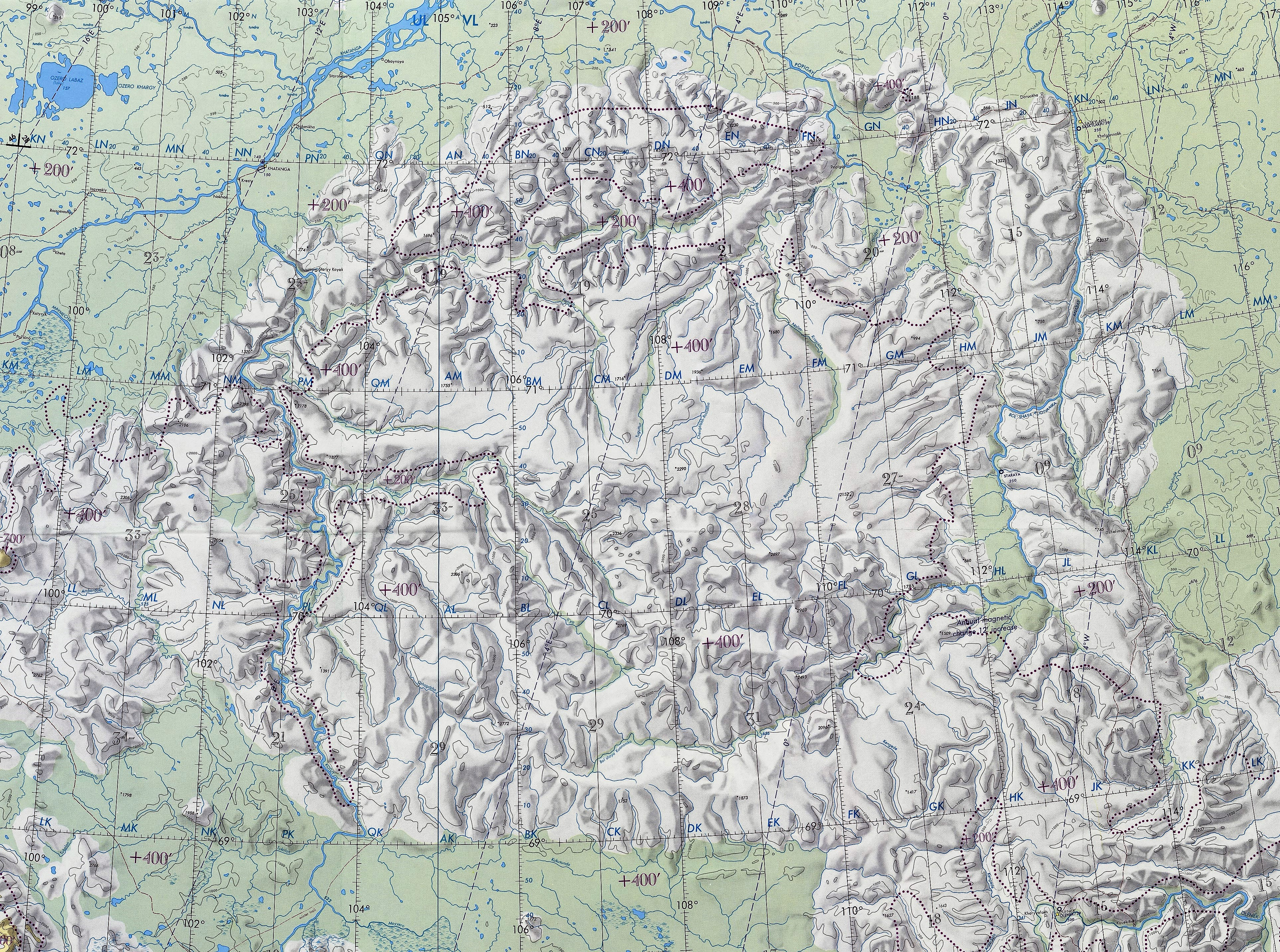
Anabar Plateau map section with Lake Labaz in the upper left corner.

== See also ==
- List of lakes of Russia
