= Kholoy =

Kholoy Холой
- Selo
- Location within Republic of Buryatia Location within Russia
- Coordinates: 50°13′N 107°07′E
- Country: Russia
- Region: Republic of Buryatia
- District: Kyakhtinsky District
- Time zone: UTC+8:00

Kholoy (Russian: Холой; Buryat: Хоолой, Khooloi) is a rural locality (a selo) in Kyakhtinsky District, Republic of Buryatia, Russia. The population was 209 as of 2010. There are 2 streets.

== Geography ==
Kholoy is located 66 km southeast of Kyakhta (the district's administrative centre) by road. Enkhe-Tala is the nearest rural locality.
