= Sosnovo-Ozerskoye =

Sosnovo-Ozerskoye Сосново-Озерское
- Selo

Other transcription(s)
  - Buryat: Нарhата
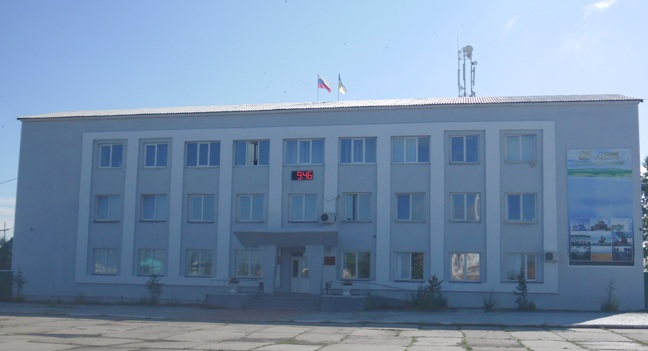

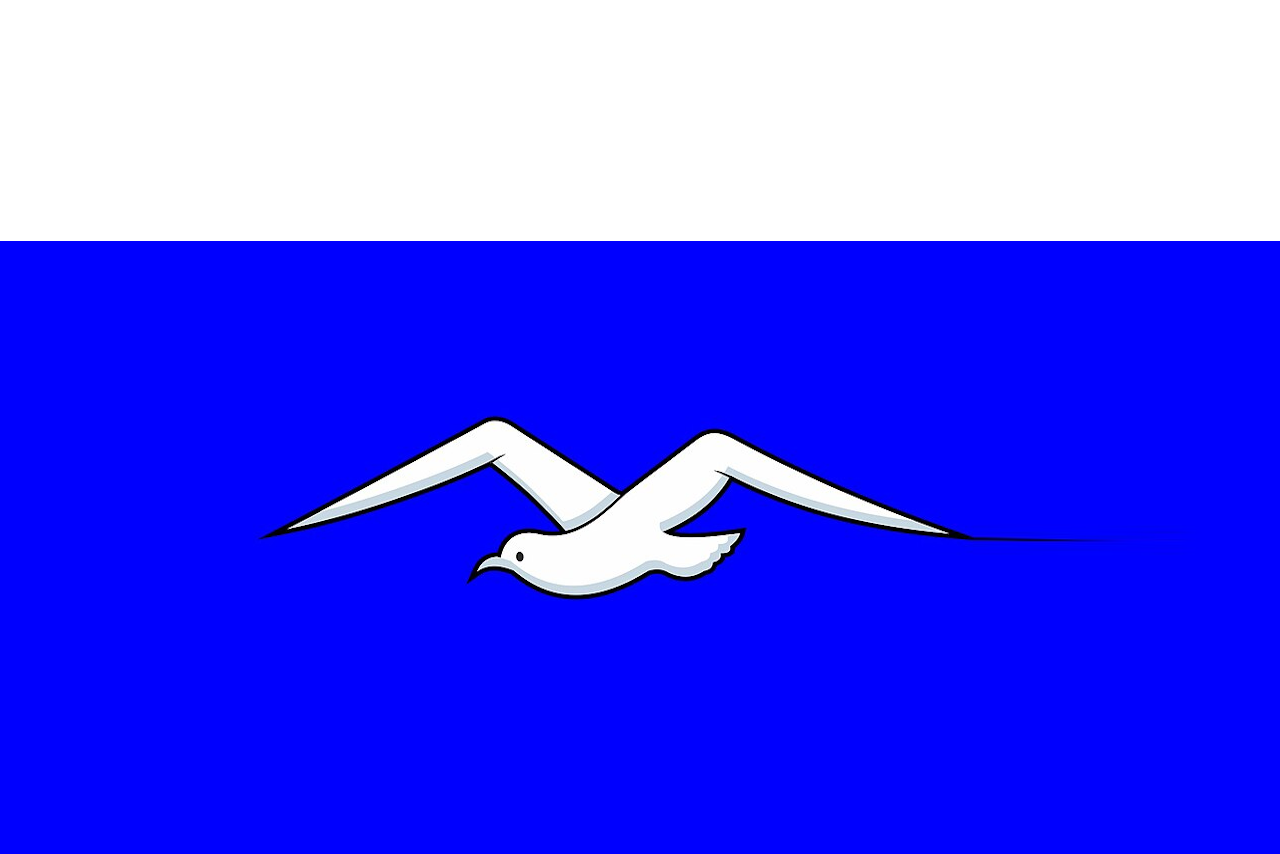
- Flag Coat of arms
- Interactive map of Sosnovo-Ozerskoye
- Location of Sosnovo-Ozerskoye Sosnovo-Ozerskoye (Republic of Buryatia)
- Coordinates: 52°31′43″N 111°32′31″E
- Country: Russia
- Federal subject: Buryatia
- Administrative district: Yeravninsky District
- SelsovietSelsoviet: Sosnovo-Ozersky
- Founded: 1882

Population (2010 Census)
  - Total: 6,128
  - Estimate (2021): 6,412 (+4.6%)

Administrative status
  - Capital of: Yeravninsky District, Sosnovo-Ozersky Selsoviet

Municipal status
  - Municipal district: Yeravninsky Municipal District
  - Rural settlement: Sosnovo-Ozerskoye Rural Settlement
  - Capital of: Yeravninsky Municipal District, Sosnovo-Ozerskoye Rural Settlement
- Time zone: UTC+8 (MSK+5)
- Postal code: 671430
- OKTMO ID: 81615460101

Sosnovo-Ozerskoye (Russian: Сосно́во-Озёрское, Buryat: Нарһата, Narhata) is a rural locality (a selo) and the administrative center of Yeravninsky District of the Republic of Buryatia, Russia. Population: 6,128 (2010 census); 5,949 (2002 census); 6,020 (1989 Soviet census).

== Geography ==
It is located by the Lake Sosnovo, part of the Yeravna-Khorga Lake System.
