= Yeravninsky District =

Yeravninsky District Еравнинский район (Russian)
- District

Other transcription(s)
  - Buryat: Яруунын аймаг
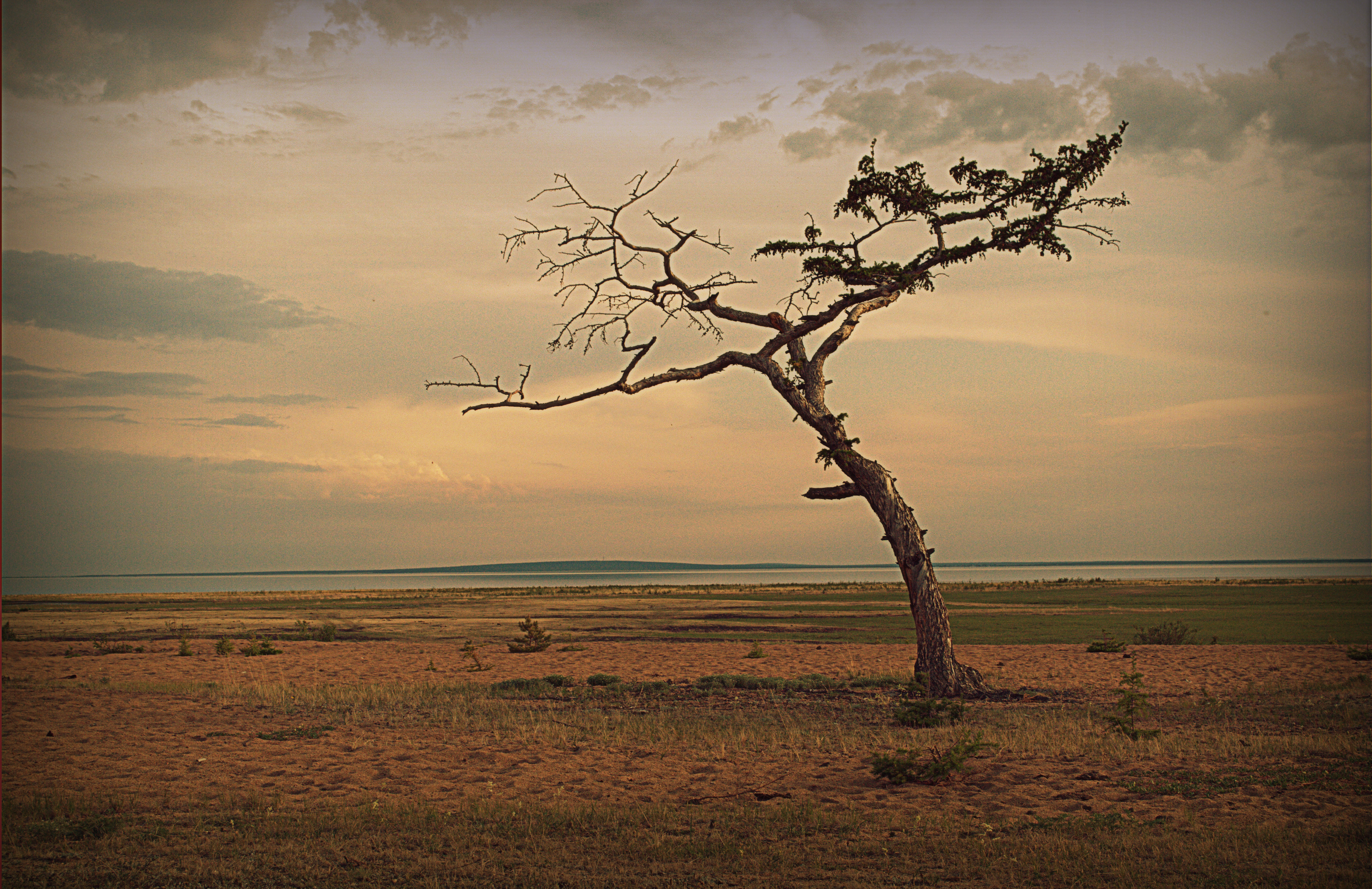
- Bolshoy Yeravna Lake in Yeravninsky District

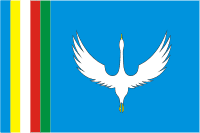
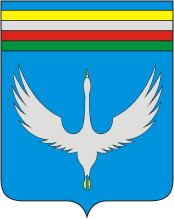
- Flag Coat of arms
- Location of Yeravninsky District in the Buryat Republic
- Coordinates: 52°31′N 111°32′E
- Country: Russia
- Federal subject: Republic of Buryatia
- Established: September 26, 1927
- Administrative center: Sosnovo-Ozerskoye

Area
  - Total: 25,600 km^{2} (9,900 sq mi)

Population (2010 Census)
  - Total: 18,705
  - Density: 0.731/km^{2} (1.89/sq mi)
  - Urban: 0%
  - Rural: 100%

Administrative structure
  - Administrative divisions: 6 Selsoviets, 8 Somons
  - Inhabited localities: 22 rural localities

Municipal structure
  - Municipally incorporated as: Yeravninsky Municipal District
  - Municipal divisions: 0 urban settlements, 14 rural settlements
- Time zone: UTC+8 (MSK+5)
- OKTMO ID: 81615000
- Website: http://yaruuna.ru

Population of Yeravninsky District
- 2010 Census: 18,705
- 2002 Census: 18,783
- 1989 Census: 21,913
- 1979 Census: 22,501

Yeravninsky District (Russian: Ера́внинский райо́н; Buryat: Яруунын аймаг, Yaruunyn aimag) is an administrative and municipal district (raion), one of the twenty-one in the Republic of Buryatia, Russia. It is located in the east of the republic. The area of the district is 25,600 square kilometers (9,900 sq mi). Its administrative center is the rural locality (a selo) of Sosnovo-Ozerskoye. As of the 2010 Census, the total population of the district was 18,705, with the population of Sosnovo-Ozerskoye accounting for 32.8% of that number.

== Geography ==
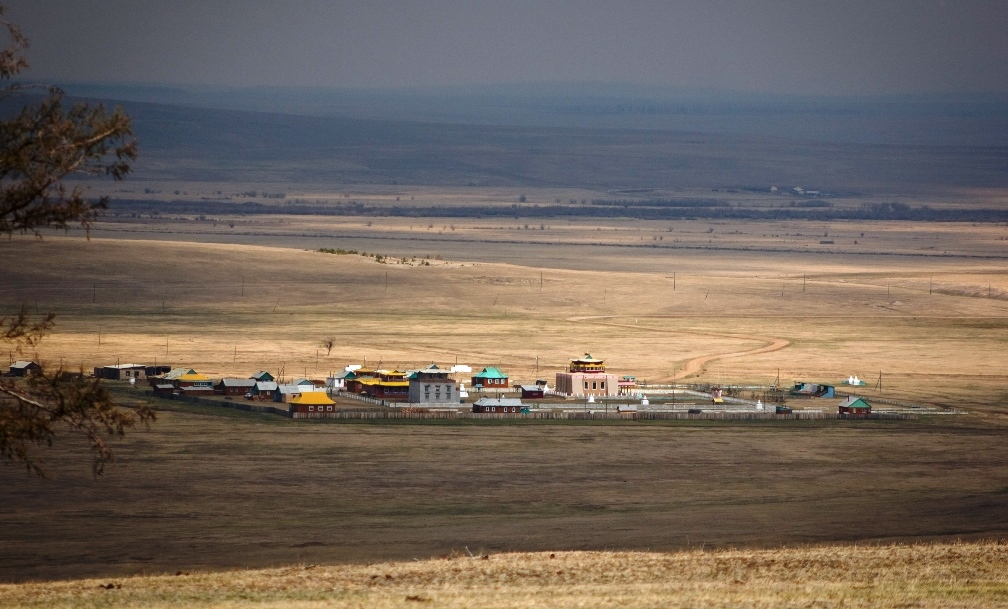
Egituysky datsan complex in Yeravninsky District

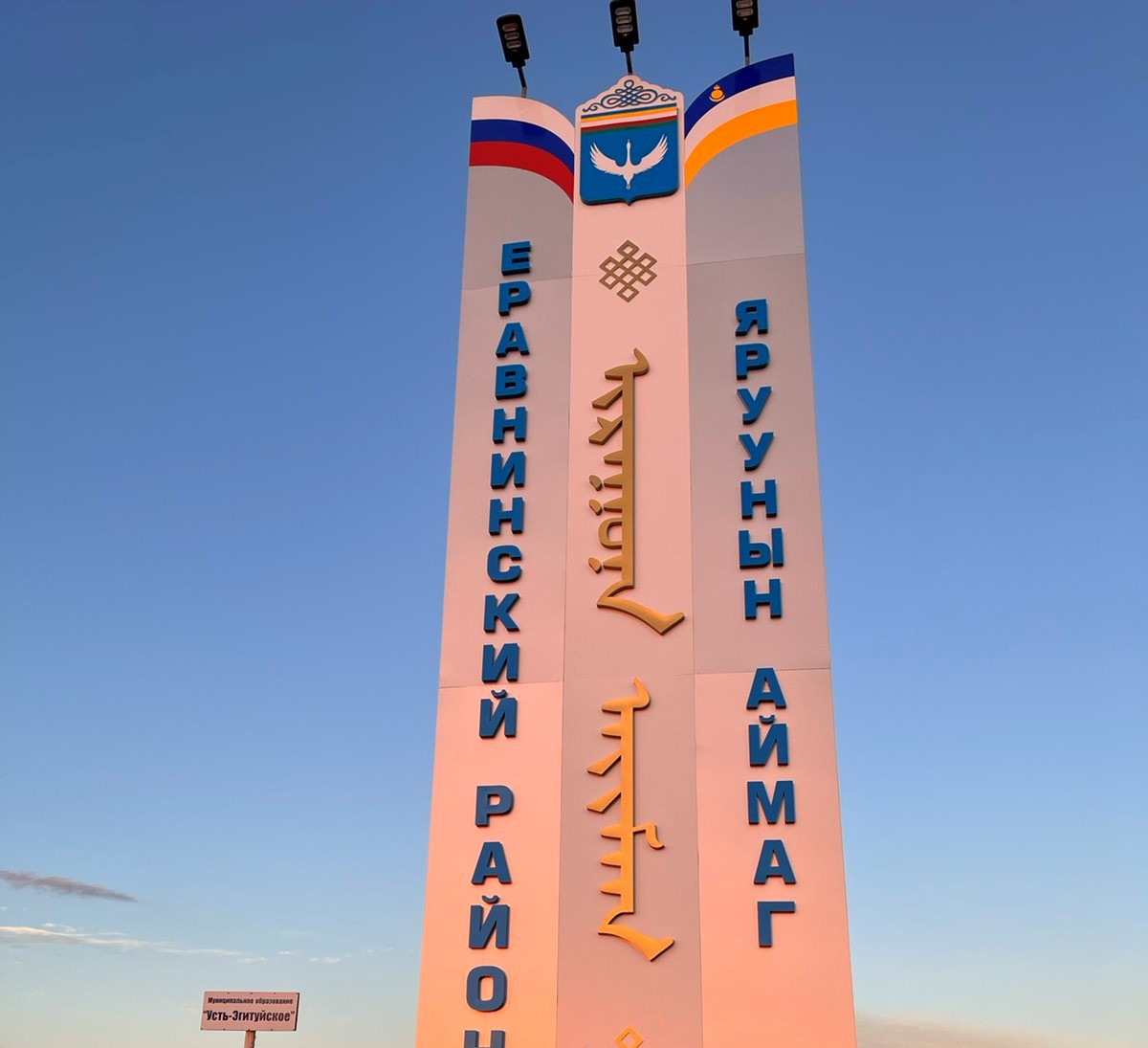
Stele at the entrance to the Yeravninsky district

The territory of the district is bound by foothills of large mountain ranges on all sides: from the southeast the spurs of the Yablonoi Mountains, from the south the Tsagan-Khurtei Range and from the west the Selenga Highlands. The Konda River flows across the district. The Yeravna-Khorga Lake System is located in the western part.

== History ==
The district was established on September 26, 1927.

== Administrative and municipal status ==
Within the framework of administrative divisions, Yeravninsky District is one of the twenty-one in the Republic of Buryatia. The district is divided into six selsoviets and eight somons, which comprise twenty-two rural localities. As a municipal division, the district is incorporated as Yeravninsky Municipal District. Its six selsoviets and eight somons are incorporated as fourteen rural settlements within the municipal district. The selo of Sosnovo-Ozerskoye serves as the administrative center of both the administrative and municipal district.
