= Parmelia shinanoana =

Scientific classification
- Kingdom: Fungi
- Division: Ascomycota
- Class: Lecanoromycetes
- Order: Lecanorales
- Family: Parmeliaceae
- Genus: Parmelia
- Species: P. shinanoana

Binomial name
- Parmelia shinanoana Zahlbr. (1927)

Species of lichen

Parmelia shinanoana is a species of saxicolous (rock-dwelling) foliose lichen in the family Parmeliaceae. Originally described from the Yatsugatake Mountains in Japan in 1927, this lichen has since been found across East Asia, from Japan and Korea through the Russian Far East into Siberia, where it reaches the northwestern edge of its range in the Transbaikal region. The species forms pale greenish to brownish-grey rosettes-shaped growths up to 20 cm across on siliceous rocks and is distinguished by a conspicuous white band of small pores around each lobe margin, as well as by its unusual chemistry that includes gyrophoric acid in the outer layer, a rare feature among related species.

== Taxonomy ==
Parmelia shinanoana was described by Alexander Zahlbruckner in 1927 from rock-dwelling material collected on Yatsugatake Mountains in Shinano (Japan); Asahina 548 serves as the lectotype (Natural History Museum, Vienna) with an isolectotype (a duplicate) at United States National Herbarium. Later chemical work showed the species to contain gyrophoric acid and 4-O-methylgyrophoric acid in the cortex, an unusual profile within Parmeliaceae, and salazinic acid in the medulla. It is morphologically akin to P. niitakana and P. pseudoshinanoana, all three having a rim-forming band of marginal pseudocyphellae.

== Description ==
Parmelia shinanoana is a fragile, rock-attached foliose lichen forming pale greenish to brownish grey rosette measuring 8–20 cm across. Its lobes are more or less linear, tightly contiguous, 1.5–3 mm wide, and only sparsely lobulate in older parts. The upper surface is shiny and even, with linear marginal pseudocyphellae (pores for gas exchange) that coalesce into a conspicuous white band about 2 mm wide around each lobe. The lower thallus surface is black with sparse to moderate rhizines that are simple to forked and 1–2 mm long. Pycnidia have not been seen in this species. Apothecia are rare, nearly sessile and inconspicuous, 1–2 mm in diameter, with a finely scalloped, pseudocyphellate thalline rim; the hymenium is 60–65 μm tall. Ascospores are poorly developed, 5–6 × 9–11 μm, with an epispore about 1 μm thick. Cortex chemistry includes atranorin, gyrophoric acid, and 4-O-methylgyrophoric acid; the medulla contains salazinic acid.

== Habitat and distribution ==
Parmelia shinanoana was originally known only from Japan, where it is infrequently collected. It grows there on siliceous rock in temperate settings, occurring at several localities across Honshu and Shikoku according to herbarium records. The species has since been documented more broadly across East Asia, including Korea, the Russian Far East (Primorsky Krai and Sakhalin), and into Siberia. In the Transbaikal region, it occurs at high elevations in alpine tundra habitats on boulders, representing the northwestern edge of its range; records from the Vitim Nature Reserve include the Delyun-Uran rapids on the Vitim River and the upper reaches of the Pravaya Khallas River at about 1,900 m elevation. The species has been recommended for inclusion in the list of protected species in the Transbaikal.

Homostegia piggotii is a lichenicolous (lichen-dwelling) fungus that has been documented growing on the thallus of P. shinanoana in the Russian Far East.
