= Mamakan =

Mamakan (Persian: ممكان) may refer to:

- Mamakan, Silvaneh
- Mamakan, Sumay-ye Beradust
- Mamakan, Russia
- Mamakan (river), a tributary of the Vitim in Russia
