= Muya =

Muya may refer to:

== Geography ==
- Muya, Democratic Republic of the Congo, a commune of the city of Mbuji-Mayi
- Muya, Republic of Buryatia, Russia, a rural locality
- Muya (river), a tributary of the Vitim in Buryatia, Russia
- Northern Muya Range, Russia
- Southern Muya Range, Russia

== People ==
- Guy Muya (born 1983), Belgian-Congolese basketball player
- Guy Kabeya Muya (born 1970), Democratic Republic of the Congo filmmaker
- Michael Muya (born 1975), Kenyan boxer
- Rose Tata-Muya (born 1960), Kenyan hurdler

== Other uses ==
- Muya language, a Qiangic language in China
- Muya Station, a railway station in Naruto, Japan

== See also ==
- Muja (disambiguation)
