= Severomuysk =

Severomuysk Северомуйск
- Urban-type settlement

Other transcription(s)
  - Buryat: Хойто-Муяын
- Interactive map of Severomuysk
- Location of Severomuysk Severomuysk (Republic of Buryatia)
- Coordinates: 56°10′N 113°35′E
- Country: Russia
- Federal subject: Buryatia
- Administrative district: Muysky District
- Urban-type settlementSelsoviet: Severomuysk Urban-Type Settlement
- Founded: mid-1970s
- Urban-type settlement status since: 1977
- Elevation: 1,328 m (4,357 ft)

Population (2010 Census)
  - Total: 2,198
  - Estimate (2025): 870 (−60.4%)

Administrative status
  - Capital of: Severomuysk Urban-Type Settlement

Municipal status
  - Municipal district: Muysky Municipal District
  - Urban settlement: Severomuyskoye Urban Settlement
  - Capital of: Severomuyskoye Urban Settlement
- Time zone: UTC+8 (MSK+5)
- Postal code: 671564
- OKTMO ID: 81635153051

Severomuysk population
- 2010 census: 2,198
- 2002 census: 4,036
- 1989 census: 9,685
- 1979 census: 3,599

Severomuysk (Russian: Северому́йск; Buryat: Хойто-Муяын, Khoyto-Muyayn) is an urban locality (an urban-type settlement) in Muysky District of the Republic of Buryatia, Russia, located about 90 kilometers (56 mi) southwest of the urban-type settlement of Taksimo, the administrative center of the district. As of the 2010 Census, its population was 2,198.

== Geography ==
Severomuysk lies directly adjacent to the eastern portal of the Severomuysky rail tunnel, in the valley of the Muyakan River, a left-hand tributary of the Muya River. The valley is bounded to the north by the Severomuysky Range, which is part of the greater Stanovoy Range.

== History ==
It was founded in the mid-1970s, as part of the construction of the 15-kilometer (9.3 mi) long Severomuysky Tunnel on the Baikal–Amur Mainline (BAM). It was granted urban-type settlement status in 1977. As the construction of the tunnel turned out to be more difficult than anticipated, construction was prolonged over twenty years and Severomuysk remained the logistical center for tunnel construction works for far longer than originally intended. With the economic downturn of the 1990s and the completion of the tunnel in 2003, the settlement lost over two thirds of its population.

== Administrative and municipal status ==
Within the framework of administrative divisions, the urban-type settlement (inhabited locality) of Severomuysk is incorporated within Muysky District as Severomuysk Urban-Type Settlement (an administrative division of the district). As a municipal division, Severomuysk Urban-Type Settlement is incorporated within Muysky Municipal District as Severomuyskoye Urban Settlement.

== Economy and infrastructure ==
The only real source of employment in the settlement is the maintenance of the Severomuysky Tunnel and its associated bypass route.
