= Bargalino =

Bargalino Баргалино
- Settlement
- Location within Republic of Buryatia Location within Russia
- Coordinates: 56°30′N 115°38′E
- Country: Russia
- Region: Republic of Buryatia
- District: Muysky District
- Time zone: UTC+8:00

Bargalino (Russian: Баргалино) is a rural locality (a settlement) in Muysky District, Republic of Buryatia, Russia. The population was 3 as of 2010. There is 1 street.

== Geography ==
Bargalino is located 72 km northeast of Taksimo (the district's administrative centre) by road. Muya is the nearest rural locality.
