= Nichatka =

Lake in Russia

- Ничатка (Russian); нича (Evenki)
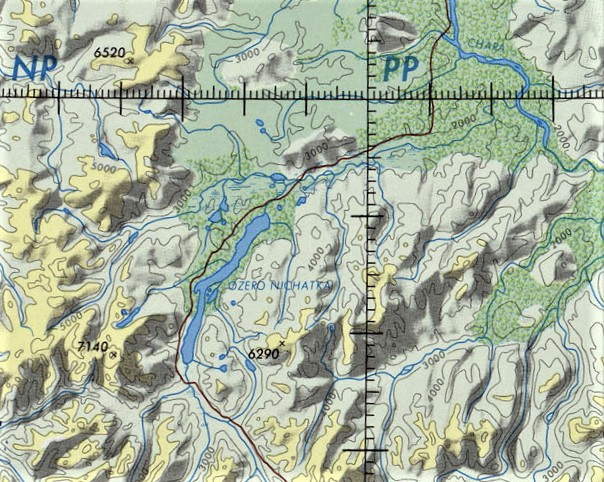
- Map section of Nichatka lake and surroundings.

- Location in Zabaykalsky Krai, Russian Far East
- Location: Patom Highlands; South Siberian System
- Coordinates: 57°45′43″N 117°39′26″E
- Primary outflows: Sen River
- Catchment area: 1,790 km^{2} (690 sq mi)
- Basin countries: Zabaykalsky Krai, Russia
- Max. length: 27 km (17 mi)
- Max. width: 3 km (1.9 mi)
- Surface area: 37.3 km^{2} (14.4 sq mi)
- Max. depth: 117 m (384 ft)
- Surface elevation: 554 m (1,818 ft)
- Frozen: October to May
- Islands: None
- Settlements: Nichatka

Nichatka (Russian: Ничатка; Evenki: нича) is a fresh water body in the Kalarsky District, Zabaykalsky Krai, Russia. The lake has an area of 37.3 km^{2} (14.4 sq mi). The name of the lake comes from the Evenki language word for "fish".

Nichatka is located to the northeast of the great Baikal. There are no settlements on the banks of the lake. The nearest airfield is Chara Airport.

== Geography ==
Nichatka is a long and narrow lake east of the gorges of the Vitim River, off the eastern limit of the Delyun-Uran Range. It stretches roughly from north to south at the southern end of the Patom Highlands and to the north of the Kodar Range.

The Sen River, a tributary of the Chara, flows from the northern end of the lakeshore. There are other deep lakes nearby, such as Oron to the southwest, but Nichatka is the deepest of the lakes of the Chara river basin. The lake is frozen between October and May; in the winter the thickness of the ice my reach 1.75 m (5.7 ft).

== Fauna ==
Among the fish species in the lake, salmon, whitefish, grayling, soroga, perch, lenok, taimen and pike, deserve mention.

== See also ==
- List of lakes of Russia
