= Nipponoparmelia laevior =

Scientific classification
- Kingdom: Fungi
- Division: Ascomycota
- Class: Lecanoromycetes
- Order: Lecanorales
- Family: Parmeliaceae
- Genus: Nipponoparmelia
- Species: N. laevior

Binomial name
- Nipponoparmelia laevior (Nyl.) K.H.Moon, Y.Ohmura & Kashiw. (2010)

Synonyms
- List: Parmelia laevior Nyl. (1890); Parmularia peltata var. laevior (Nyl.) Räsänen (1939); Parmelia laevior f. denigrata Hue (1899); Parmelia petrophila Vain. (1921); Parmelia hakonensis Zahlbr. (1927); Parmelia laevior f. hakonensis (Zahlbr.) Asahina (1951); Parmelia laevior f. albissima Asahina (1951); Parmelia ontakensis Asahina (1954)

Species of lichen-forming fungus

Nipponoparmelia laevior is a species of foliose lichen in the family Parmeliaceae. Originally described from Japan in 1890 as Parmelia laevior, this lichen was transferred to the newly established genus Nipponoparmelia in 2010 following molecular studies that revealed it belonged to a distinct East Asian evolutionary lineage, and it now serves as the type species for this genus. The species has been recorded from Japan, Taiwan, China, and across the southern Russian Far East, where it grows as an epiphyte on the bark of conifer and broad-leaved trees in mixed forests. It forms pale greenish to brownish-grey leaf-like growths 6–15 cm across and is distinguished by its shiny, flat upper surface with tiny point-like pores arranged along the lobe edges, and by its frequent production of urn-shaped fruiting bodies that open at maturity to reveal a radially split disc.

== Taxonomy ==
It was first described as a new species in 1890 by William Nylander, who named it Parmelia laevior. In the protologue he compared it with a smooth-thallus form he had earlier called var. laevis under Parmelia omphalodes var. panniformis, and also with P. divaricata; he cautioned against confusion with P. sublaevigata and recorded it from bark at Ushigome in Japan. In 2010, molecular phylogenetic analyses of nuclear and mitochondrial DNA sequences demonstrated that Parmelia laevior and several morphologically similar East Asian species did not belong within Parmelia in the strict sense. Instead, they formed a distinct, well-supported lineage characterised by a grey to brownish thallus with tiny punctiform (point-like) pseudocyphellae confined to lobe margins, simple or sparsely branched rhizines, and production of atranorin. These features justified their placement in the genus Nipponoparmelia, for which N. laevior was selected as the type species.

== Description ==
Nipponoparmelia laevior forms a foliose (leafy) thallus that sits loosely attached (adnate) on bark and is firm, pale greenish to brownish mineral grey. It typically spans 6–15 cm across. The lobes are narrow and mostly parallel-sided (sublinear), crowded edge-to-edge, 1.5–4 mm wide, and may show small side lobes. The upper surface is shiny and flat to faintly wrinkled, becoming sparsely cross-cracked with age. Tiny aeration pores (pseudocyphellae) are arranged along the sides of the lobe edges; they are round to slightly elongated and about 0.2 mm long. The underside is black and moderately covered with rhizines, which are fine, root-like holdfasts. These structures are simple to forked, sometimes sparsely squarrose at maturity, and 1–2 mm long. Small black pycnidia are common; they release straight to slightly curved cylindrical conidia 6–8 μm long. Fruiting bodies (apothecia) are frequent, usually on a short stalk and urn-shaped when young (stipitate, urceolate); they open at maturity to a radially split disc 5–10 mm across. The thallus-derived rim (amphithecium) bears scattered wart-like pseudocyphellae. The spore-bearing layer (hymenium) is 60–65 μm tall; ascospores are 8–9 × 14–16 μm with an outer wall about 1 μm thick. The cortex contains atranorin and chloroatranorin; spot tests are K+ (yellow), C−, KC−, and P−. The medulla contains salazinic acid with traces of consalazinic acid; spot tests are K+ (bright yellow → red), P+ (strong yellow), C−, and KC−.

Nipponoparmelia laevior differs from N. perplicata in its elongate, slightly concave lobes and clear marginal pseudocyphellae (vs short lobes with downward-rolled margins and pseudocyphellae mainly visible on the lobe undersides).

== Habitat and distribution ==
Nipponoparmelia laevior is an epiphyte on conifer and broadleaved bark in conifer–broadleaf, broadleaf and mixed forests. It has been recorded from Japan, Taiwan, and China. In Russia it is widespread but local in the southern Russian Far East (Amur Oblast, Jewish Autonomous Oblast, Khabarovsk Krai, Primorsky Krai, and Sakhalin Region).
