= Vitim, Republic of Buryatia =

Vitim Витим
- Settlement
- Location within Republic of Buryatia Location within Russia
- Coordinates: 56°13′N 115°43′E
- Country: Russia
- Region: Republic of Buryatia
- District: Muysky District
- Time zone: UTC+8:00

Vitim (Russian: Витим) is a rural locality (a settlement) in Muysky District, Republic of Buryatia, Russia. The population was 28 as of 2010.

== Geography ==
Vitim is located 69 km southeast of Taksimo (the district's administrative centre) by road. Shivery is the nearest rural locality.
