= Nipponoparmelia pseudolaevior =

Scientific classification
- Kingdom: Fungi
- Division: Ascomycota
- Class: Lecanoromycetes
- Order: Lecanorales
- Family: Parmeliaceae
- Genus: Nipponoparmelia
- Species: N. pseudolaevior

Binomial name
- Nipponoparmelia pseudolaevior (Asahina) K.H.Moon, Y.Ohmura & Kashiw. (2010)

Synonyms
- Parmelia pseudolaevior Asahina (1951)

Species of lichen-forming fungus

Nipponoparmelia pseudolaevior is a species of foliose lichen in the family Parmeliaceae. Originally described from Japan in 1951, this East Asian lichen is characterized by its narrow, overlapping lobes fringed with dense, finger-like isidia and a grey, tightly attached thallus. It grows mainly on tree bark in mixed forests in Japan, South Korea, and the southern Russian Far East, where it favors relatively open, moist microsites, often along streams.

== Taxonomy ==
It was described as a new species in 1951 by Yasuhiko Asahina, as Parmelia pseudolaevior. In naming the species, Asahina explicitly contrasted it with P. laevior Nyl. f. microphyllina Hue (1899) and argued that the "microphylline" trait, where the thallus centre is cut into many small, flattened, coral-like branchlets, warrants recognition at species rank. Asahina listed the species from Japan on Hokkaido, Honshu, Shikoku and Kyushu.

Molecular data based on three gene regions placed Parmelia pseudolaevior among the East Asian lineage separated from Parmelia in the strict sense, supporting its transfer to Nipponoparmelia. The genus encompasses taxa with marginal punctiform (point-like) pseudocyphellae and a grey, adnate thallus bearing simple rhizines, traits present in this species and absent in true Parmelia, confirming its reassignment.

Subsequent work on Korean and Russian material provided a fuller account of the species and clarified its relationships within the genus. Sergey Kondratyuk and co-authors regarded N. pseudolaevior as an isidiate counterpart of N. laevior, sharing the same general lobe morphology but distinguished by dense, somewhat erect cylindrical isidia that develop along the lobe margins and laminal secondary lobules. They also separated N. pseudolaevior from N. isidioclada, which forms shorter coralloid isidioid growths that crumble into soredia and contains gyrophoric rather than salazinic acid, and pointed out that isidiate material had sometimes been misidentified as Punctelia rudecta because of the marginal pseudocyphellae and black lower surface.

== Description ==
Nipponoparmelia pseudolaevior forms foliose rosettes up to about 10 cm across that are closely to somewhat loosely attached to bark or rock and become rather brittle when dry. The thallus is dull greenish- to brownish grey, with narrow, more or less linear lobes 1–3 mm wide whose margins often lift slightly from the substrate[ and overlap one another. Towards the centre of older thalli the lobes frequently break up into rounded to irregular secondary lobules a few millimetres across. These lobules and the lobe margins bear abundant, slender cylindrical isidia 0.7–2 mm long and 0.1–0.3 mm wide, which are suberect to erect, only sparingly branched and do not crumble into soredia with age. Small, round white pseudocyphellae 0.1–0.3 mm across occur mainly along the lobe edges and sometimes on the isidia, remaining relatively inconspicuous and not developing into granular or coralloid outgrowths. The upper surface is shiny, sometimes partly dusted with white pruina and becoming somewhat wrinkled in older parts of the thallus; the medulla is white.

The lower surface is black, often with a narrow paler brownish margin, and carries a moderate to dense cover of simple to forked rhizines up to about 1.5–2 mm long. Apothecia are rare; they are short-stalked to almost stalkless, 1–8 (sometimes up to 11) mm in diameter, with a smooth thalline margin that becomes toothed or lobulate and is punctured by elevated pseudocyphellae. The brown disc commonly splits radially with age. The spore-bearing layer (hymenium) is about 60–65 μm tall, and the ascospores are broadly ellipsoid, measuring roughly 10–12 by 15–17 μm with a wall about 1 μm thick. Pycnidia, in contrast, are usually present as small black dots near the lobe margins. Chemically, the species contains atranorin, chloratranorin and salazinic acid as major constituents, with consalazinic acid, protocetraric acid and an additional fatty acid present in smaller amounts.

== Habitat and distribution ==
Nipponoparmelia pseudolaevior is primarily an epiphyte on the bark and branches of trees in mixed forests, where it favours relatively open, humid sites such as forest margins and stream corridors. Specimens have been collected from the trunks of Cryptomeria japonica and a range of deciduous broad-leaved trees, with more occasional records from conifers such as Tsuga diversifolia, Abies veitchii and A. sachalinensis, and in some cases directly from rock surfaces. It often forms part of corticolous lichen communities together with species of Menegazzia, Parmelia and Lepraria.

The species appears to be restricted to eastern Asia. It is widely distributed in Japan and has been reported from scattered localities in South Korea and the southern Russian Far East. In South Korea it is currently known only from the montane sites Mt Taebaek and Mt Baegun, whereas Russian collections come from mixed and deciduous–coniferous forests on Sakhalin Island, the southern Kuril Islands and several sites in Primorsky and Khabarovsk Krais.
