= Vitim Nature Reserve =

Nature reserve in Irkutsk Oblast, Russia

- Russian: Витимский заповедник (Also: Vitimsky)
- IUCN category Ia (strict nature reserve)
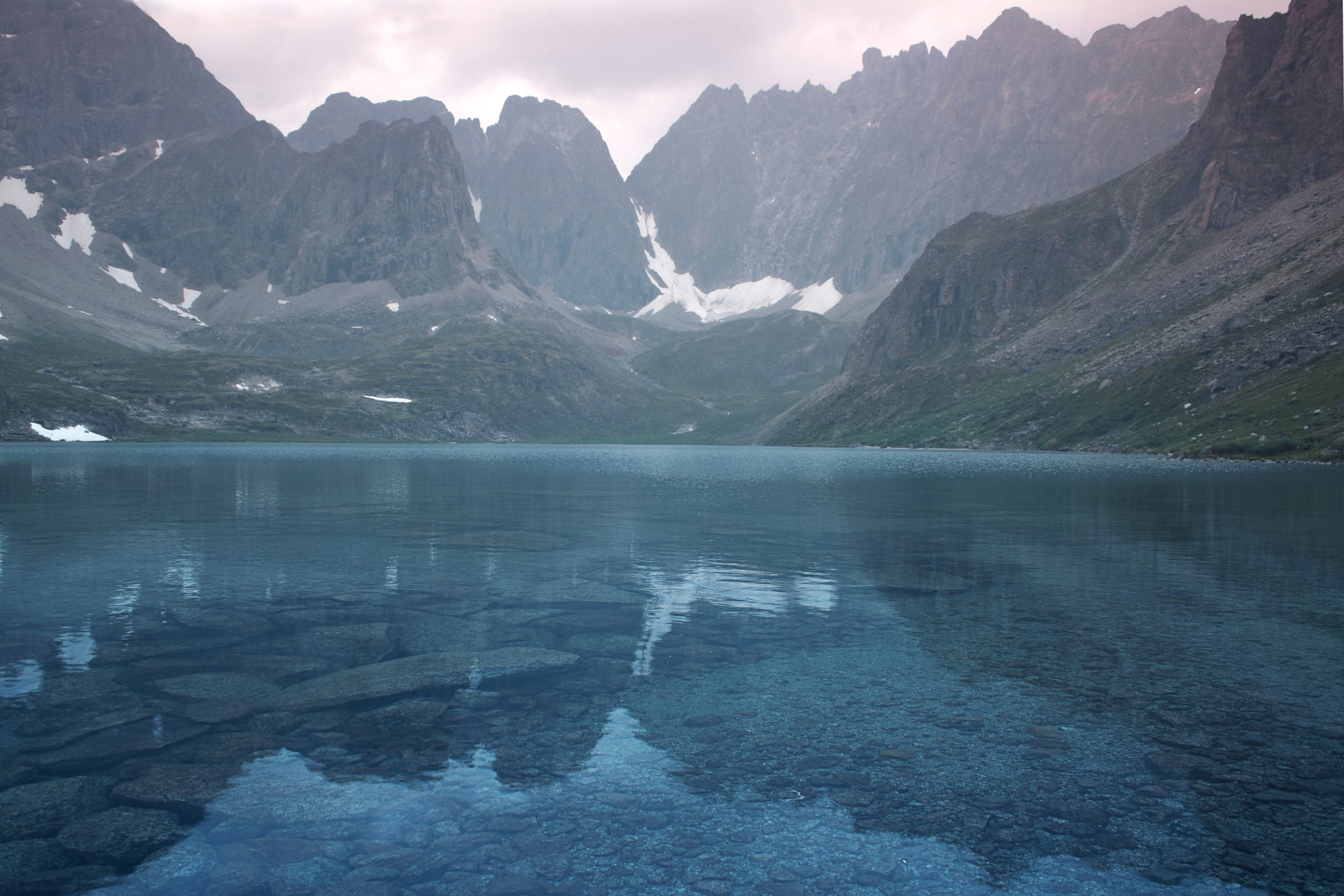
- Eastern side of Kodar Ridge; Looking towards Vitim reserve

- Location within Russia
- Location: Irkutsk Oblast
- Nearest city: Bodaybo
- Coordinates: 57°12′10″N 116°48′28″E
- Area: 585,838 hectares (1,447,637 acres; 2,262 sq mi)
- Established: 1982
- Governing body: Ministry of Natural Resources and Environment (Russia)
- Website: http://www.vitimskiy.ru//

Vitim Nature Reserve (Russian: Витимский заповедник) (also Vitimsky) is a Russian 'zapovednik' (strict nature reserve) in the mountains 400 km northeast of Lake Baikal in the Irkutsk region of Siberia. It covers the upper reaches of the Vitim River, a left tributary of the Lena River. The reserve protects a wide variety high-altitude, continental climate flora and fauna complexes: larch taiga, cedar thickets, mountain tundra, and sub-alpine meadows of the Delyun-Uran and Kodar Mountains. The reserve is located in the southeast of the Bodaybinsky District of Irkutsk Oblast, 150 km east of the regional city of Bodaybo. It was formally established in 1982, and covers 585,838 ha (2,261.93 sq mi).

== Topography ==
The Vitim Reserve is in rugged mountain terrain with deep river valleys. It ascends from Lake Oron in the west to the top of the Kodar Mountain ridge in the south and east of the reserve. The Vitim River runs along the western border of the reserve.

== Climate and Ecoregion ==
Vitim is located in the East Siberian taiga ecoregion. This ecoregion is located between the Yenisei River and Lena River. Its northern border reaches the Arctic Circle, and its southern border reaches 52°N latitude. The dominant vegetation is light coniferous taiga with Larix gmelinii forming the canopy in areas with low snow cover. This ecoregion is rich in minerals.

The climate of Vitim is Subarctic climate, dry winter (Köppen climate classification Subarctic climate(Dwc)). This climate is characterized by mild summers (only 1–3 months above 10 °C (50.0 °F)) and cold winters having monthly precipitation less than one-tenth of the wettest summer month. Because reserve is in a temperate zone far from the oceans and with mountain terrain, it experiences sharply continental climate. Winter averages 7 months, beginning in October and running through April.

== Flora and fauna ==
The plant life of the reserve is highly dependent on altitude. From the river valley floors to about 1,200 metres (3,900 ft) is a forest zone of primarily larch trees (Larix gmelinii) and some Scots pine on sandy soils. Forest makes up about 12% of the Vitim Reserve. Above the forest zone from 1200 meters to 1500 meters is a belt of shrub with some birch and cedar; the underbrush is typically golden rhododendron (Kashkarov), currant and willow. This zone makes up about 33% of the reserve. Above this is a sub-alpine zone of tundra and alpine meadow. Here there are dwarf birches, moss, and grasses. Above 2,700 metres (8,900 ft) is a bald mountain zone above which the only plant life is a few types of lichen. Scientists on the reserve have recorded 1,085 species of vascular plants.

Mammals of the Vitim region include reindeer, moose, elk, bighorn sheep, brown bear, sable; 46 species of mammals have been recorded in the boundaries. About 234 species of birds have been recorded, of which 140 are nesting on the site. Typical birds include Wood grouse (Western capercaillie). Also recorded are 23 species of fish and 4 species of amphibians.

== Ecoeducation and access ==
As a strict nature reserve, the Vitim Reserve is mostly closed to the general public, although scientists and those with 'environmental education' purposes can make arrangements with park management for visits. There are several 'ecotourist' routes in the reserve, however, that are open to the public. These require permits to be obtained in advance. The main office is in the city of Bodayo.

== See also ==
- List of Russian Nature Reserves (class 1a 'zapovedniks')
- National Parks of Russia
