= Muya, Republic of Buryatia =

Muya Муя
- Settlement
- Location within Republic of Buryatia Location within Russia
- Coordinates: 56°27′N 115°39′E
- Country: Russia
- Region: Republic of Buryatia
- District: Muysky District
- Time zone: UTC+8:00

Muya (Russian: Муя) is a rural locality (a settlement) in Muysky District, Republic of Buryatia, Russia. The population was 184 as of 2010. There are 8 streets.

== Geography ==
Muya is located 66 km east of Taksimo (the district's administrative centre) by road. Ust-Muya is the nearest rural locality.
