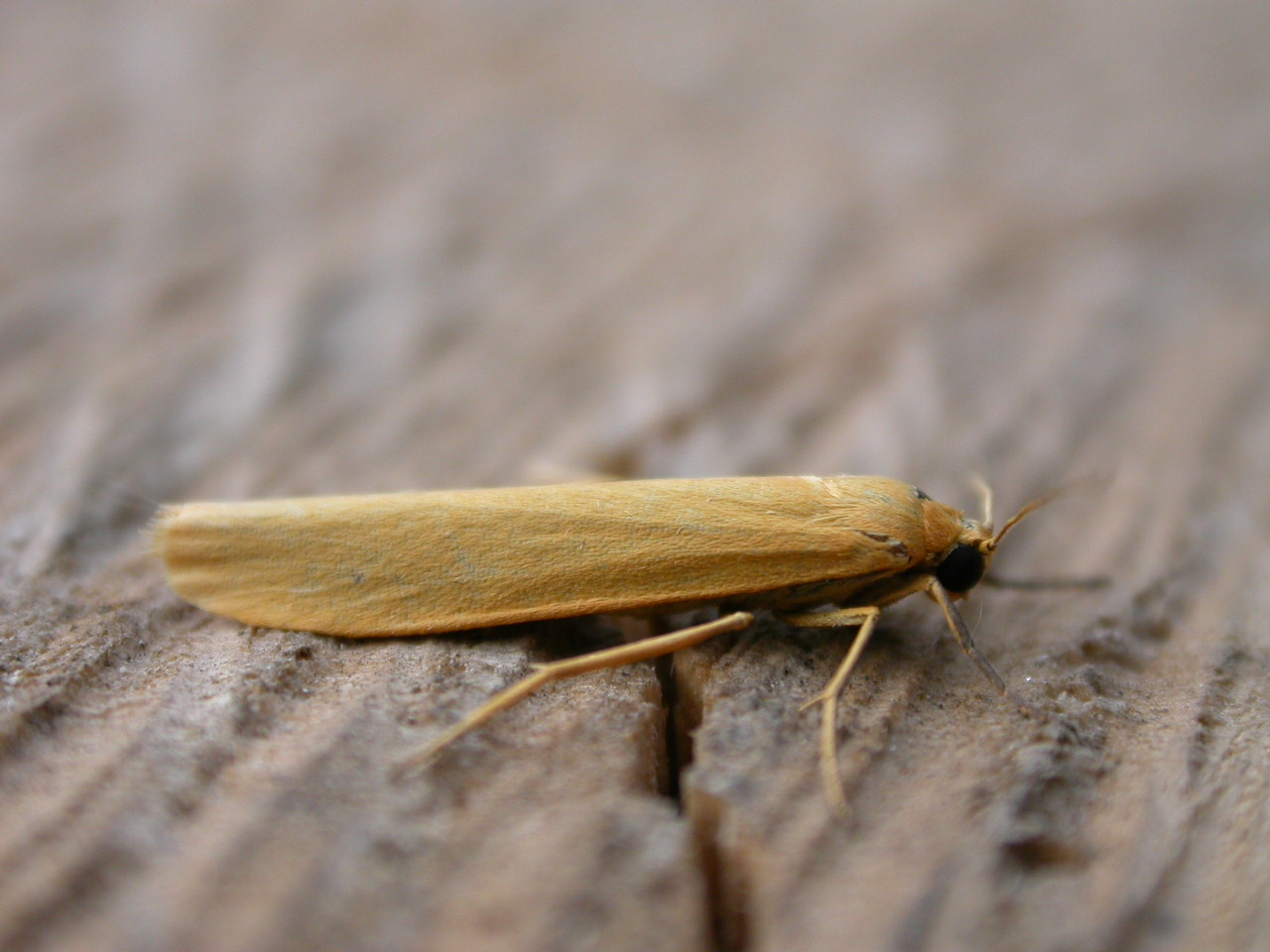

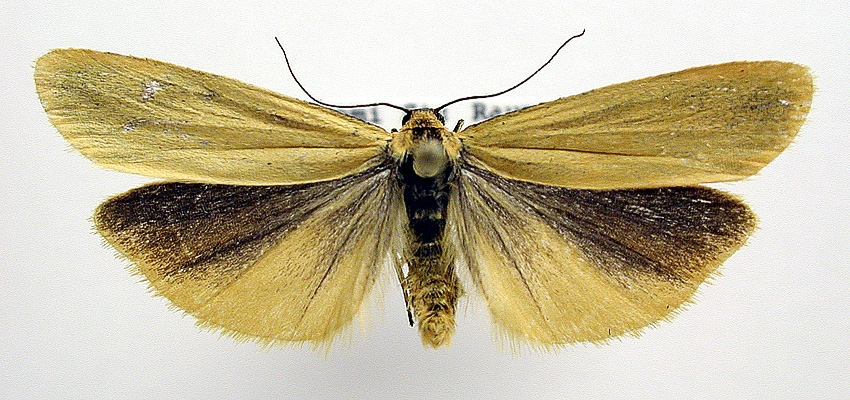

Scientific classification
- Kingdom: Animalia
- Phylum: Arthropoda
- Class: Insecta
- Order: Lepidoptera
- Superfamily: Noctuoidea
- Family: Erebidae
- Subfamily: Arctiinae
- Genus: Eilema
- Species: E. lutarella

Binomial name
- Eilema lutarella (Linnaeus, 1758)

Synonyms
- Phalaena Tinea lutarella Linnaeus, 1758; Eilema lutarellum; Manulea lutarella; Lithosia lutarella; Noctua luteola [Denis & Schiffermüller], 1775; Phalaena alboflava Retzius, 1783; Noctua lutosa Esper, 1783; Lithosia lutea Fabricius, 1798; Lithosia lutarella var. nigrogrisea Peets, 1908; Eilema lutarella var. postmelanica Strand in Ulmer, Strand, Horn, 1917; Lithosia lutarella ab. nigrocincta Speyer, 1862; Eilema lutarella luqueti Leraut, 2006; Lithosia lutarella diluta Rothschild; Eilema lutea

= Manulea lutarella =

Species of moth

Eilema lutarella is a species of moth in the family Erebidae. It is found in North Africa through Central Europe up to the area surrounding the Amur River and Sakhalin. In the north, it is found up to Scandinavia, Komi Republic in European Russia, Vitim river in Siberia.

The wingspan is 27–30 mm. The moth flies from July to August depending on the location.

The larvae feed on lichen.

== Subspecies ==
- Eilema lutarella lutarella
- Eilema lutarella luqueti (Leraut, 2006) (France)
