= Flight 498 =

Flight 498 may refer to:

- Aeroflot Flight 498, crashed on 14 June 1981
- Aeroméxico Flight 498, crashed on 31 August 1986
- Crossair Flight 498, crashed on 10 January 2000
