= Ust-Muya =

Ust-Muya Усть-Муя
- Settlement
- Location within Republic of Buryatia Location within Russia
- Coordinates: 56°24′N 115°37′E
- Country: Russia
- Region: Republic of Buryatia
- District: Muysky District
- Time zone: UTC+8:00

Ust-Muya (Russian: Усть-Муя; Buryat: Муяын Адаг, Muiayn Adag) is a rural locality (a settlement) in Muysky District, Republic of Buryatia, Russia. The population was 632 in 2010. There are 14 streets.

== Geography ==
Ust-Muya is located 59 kilometres (37 mi) east of Taksimo (the district's administrative centre) by road. Muya is the nearest rural locality.
