= Parmelia pseudoshinanoana =

Scientific classification
- Kingdom: Fungi
- Division: Ascomycota
- Class: Lecanoromycetes
- Order: Lecanorales
- Family: Parmeliaceae
- Genus: Parmelia
- Species: P. pseudoshinanoana

Binomial name
- Parmelia pseudoshinanoana Asahina (1951)

Synonyms
- Parmelia laevior f. microphyllina Hue (1899); Parmelia rudecta var. microphyllina (Nyl.) Zahlbr. (1929)

Species of lichen

Parmelia pseudoshinanoana is a species of corticolous (bark-dwelling) foliose lichen in the family Parmeliaceae. Described from Mount Fuji in 1951, this lichen is widespread across Japan, occurring on tree bark in temperate forests throughout Honshu and Shikoku. The species forms pale greenish- to brownish-grey rosette-shaped growths 6–12 cm across and is distinguished by its lobe edges that become densely covered with tiny upright projections and a continuous white rim of small pores—features that help separate it from the related P. shinanoana, which has simpler root-like structures and different chemistry.

== Taxonomy ==
Parmelia pseudoshinanoana was described by Yasuhiko Asahina in 1951 from the Omiya-guchi, 2-gōme route on Mount Fuji (Suruga Province). In his 1987 Parmelia monograph, Mason Hale placed Parmelia laevior f. microphyllina Hue (1899; Japan) in synonymy with this species. Asahina regarded P. pseudoshinanoana as a lobulate relative of P. shinanoana; both have a continuous, pale marginal band of pseudocyphellae, but P. shinanoana typically has mostly simple (unbranched) rhizines and a different chemistry (gyrophoric acid in the cortex).

== Description ==
Parmelia pseudoshinanoana is a foliose lichen that forms fragile, pale greenish- to brownish-grey rosettes 6–12 cm across. Its lobes are more or less linear and contiguous, 1.5–3 mm wide; their margins become densely covered with tiny, slightly erect lobules (0.2–0.3 mm wide, 1–2 mm long). The upper surface is flat and shiny, often faintly white-pruinose at the tips, and shows a more-or-less continuous white rim along the edges formed by marginal pseudocyphellae (small pale pores). The lower surface is black and densely rhizinate; the rhizines are shiny and become densely squarrosely branched, 1–3 mm long. Pycnidia have not been observed. Apothecia are infrequent, short-stalked to nearly sessile, 2–4 mm in diameter, with a finely scalloped, pseudocyphellate thalline rim. The spore-bearing tissue (the hymenium) is 55–60 μm tall and the ascospores measure 6 × 10–12 μm with an epispore about 1 μm thick. The lichen contains atranorin and salazinic acid.

== Habitat and distribution ==
The species is widespread but not abundant in Japan, growing on the bark of trees in temperate forests. It has been recorded from numerous prefectures across Honshu and Shikoku.
