= Mamakan, Russia =

Mamakan Мамакан
- Urban-type settlement
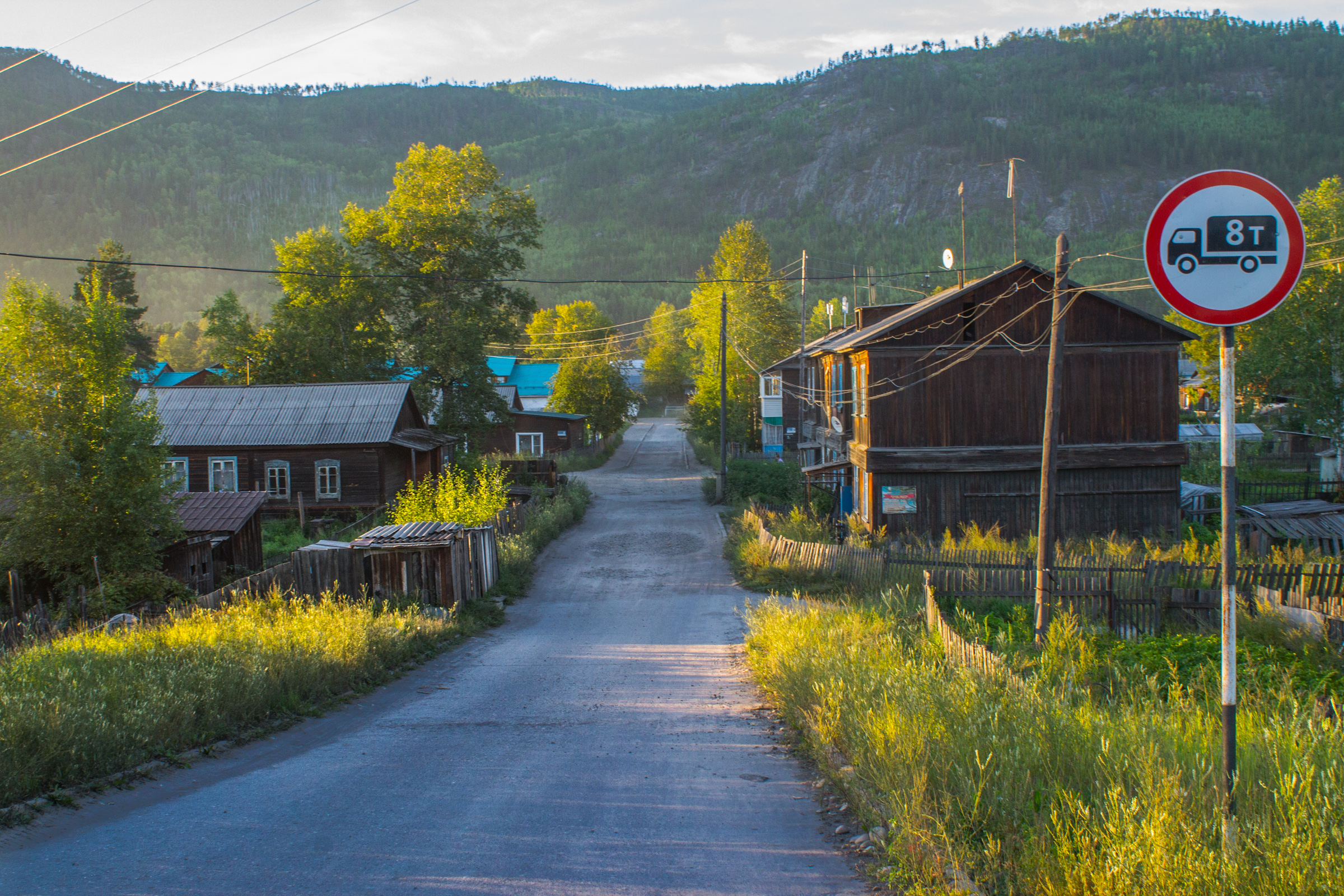
- Road and house in Mamakan

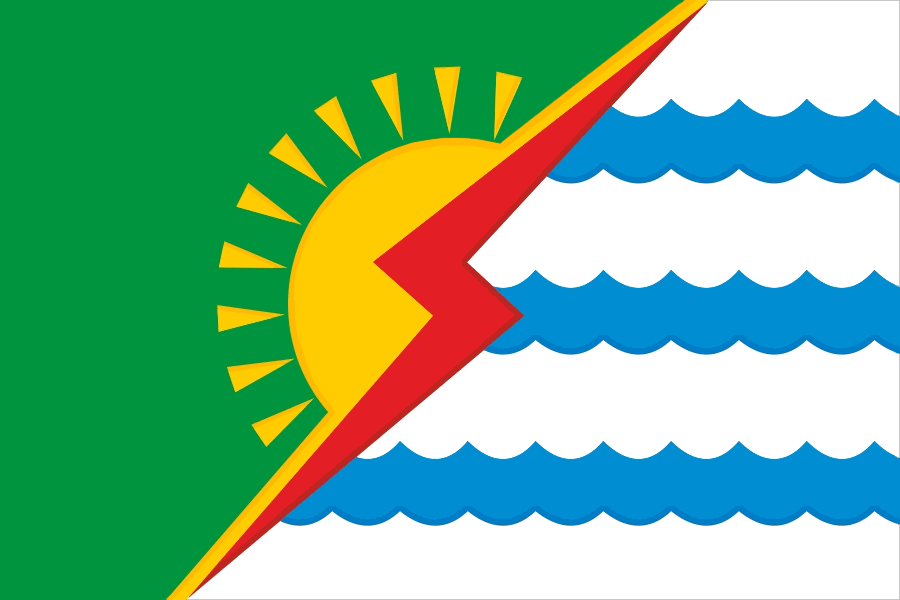
- Flag
- Interactive map of Mamakan
- Location of Mamakan Mamakan (Irkutsk Oblast)
- Coordinates: 57.8175°N 114.0176°E
- Country: Russia
- Federal subject: Irkutsk Oblast
- Administrative district: Bodaybinsky District
- Elevation: 244 m (801 ft)

Population (2010 Census)
  - Total: 2,068
  - Estimate (2025): 1,674 (−19.1%)

Administrative status
  - Capital of: Mamakan Urban Settlement
- Time zone: UTC+8 (MSK+5)
- Postal code: 666911
- OKTMO ID: 25602162051

Mamakan (Russian: Мамакан) is an urban locality (an urban-type settlement) in Bodaybinsky District of Irkutsk Oblast, Russia. Population: 2,068 (2010 census); 2,288 (2002 census); 3,280 (1989 Soviet census).

Mamakan is the capital of the Mamakan Urban Settlement (Мамаканское городское поселение) municipal unit, which includes only the Mamakan urban locality.

== Geography ==
The locality is located 16 km (9.9 mi) southwest of Bodaybo by the Vitim. The Mamakan, one of its main tributaries, flows into the Vitim near the settlement.

== Climate ==
Climate data for Mamakan (extremes 1959-present)
Month	Jan	Feb	Mar	Apr	May	Jun	Jul	Aug	Sep	Oct	Nov	Dec	Year
Record high °C (°F)	1.8 (35.2)	7.4 (45.3)	16.7 (62.1)	26.8 (80.2)	32.9 (91.2)	37.5 (99.5)	38.7 (101.7)	36.7 (98.1)	29.0 (84.2)	21.6 (70.9)	9.7 (49.5)	2.0 (35.6)	38.7 (101.7)
Mean daily maximum °C (°F)	−24.7 (−12.5)	−16.5 (2.3)	−4.0 (24.8)	6.4 (43.5)	15.2 (59.4)	24.4 (75.9)	26.9 (80.4)	23.1 (73.6)	13.1 (55.6)	1.6 (34.9)	−13.4 (7.9)	−24.6 (−12.3)	2.3 (36.1)
Daily mean °C (°F)	−28.8 (−19.8)	−22.8 (−9.0)	−12.2 (10.0)	−0.5 (31.1)	7.6 (45.7)	15.6 (60.1)	18.7 (65.7)	15.4 (59.7)	6.9 (44.4)	−2.7 (27.1)	−17.5 (0.5)	−28.1 (−18.6)	−4.0 (24.7)
Mean daily minimum °C (°F)	−32.5 (−26.5)	−28.0 (−18.4)	−18.8 (−1.8)	−6.4 (20.5)	1.0 (33.8)	8.5 (47.3)	12.3 (54.1)	10.1 (50.2)	2.9 (37.2)	−6.1 (21.0)	−21.3 (−6.3)	−31.6 (−24.9)	−9.2 (15.5)
Record low °C (°F)	−53.5 (−64.3)	−50.4 (−58.7)	−47.0 (−52.6)	−31.8 (−25.2)	−10.2 (13.6)	−3.6 (25.5)	0.6 (33.1)	−2.1 (28.2)	−9.5 (14.9)	−32.0 (−25.6)	−46.0 (−50.8)	−50.6 (−59.1)	−53.5 (−64.3)
Average precipitation mm (inches)	18.7 (0.74)	13.4 (0.53)	10.4 (0.41)	18.4 (0.72)	41.7 (1.64)	64.2 (2.53)	83.9 (3.30)	77.3 (3.04)	55.9 (2.20)	25.1 (0.99)	23.6 (0.93)	20.9 (0.82)	453.5 (17.85)
Source: pogoda.ru.net

== Notable people ==
- Fyodor Kudryashov (1987) - Russian footballer
