= Vitim =

Vitim (Russian: Витим) is the name of several inhabited localities in Russia.

== Modern localities ==
- Vitim, Sakha Republic, an urban locality (an urban-type settlement) in Lensky District of the Sakha Republic
- Vitim, Republic of Buryatia, a rural locality (a settlement) in Muysky Selsoviet of Muysky District in the Republic of Buryatia; 56°13′N 115°44′E

== Alternative names ==
- Vitim, alternative name of Romanovka, a selo in Vitimsky Selsoviet of Bauntovsky District in the Republic of Buryatia; 53°13′N 112°47′E
