= Parmelia niitakana =

Scientific classification
- Kingdom: Fungi
- Division: Ascomycota
- Class: Lecanoromycetes
- Order: Lecanorales
- Family: Parmeliaceae
- Genus: Parmelia
- Species: P. niitakana

Binomial name
- Parmelia niitakana Asahina (1951)

Synonyms
- Parmelia shinanoana f. calvescens Zahlbr. (1933)

Species of lichen

Parmelia niitakana is a species of corticolous (bark-dwelling) foliose lichen in the family Parmeliaceae. Endemic to Taiwan, this lichen was described in 1951 from specimens collected on Yu Shan, the island's highest peak, and grows exclusively on tree bark at high elevations above 3,000 metres. The species forms pale greenish-grey rosette-shaped growths 6–10 cm across and is recognized by the conspicuous white rim along its lobe margins, as well as by its unusually large ascospores, a feature it shares with the related Philippine species Parmelia sectilis.

== Taxonomy ==
Parmelia niitakana was described by Yasuhiko Asahina in 1951 from material collected on Mount Niitaka (now Yu Shan), Taiwan; the lectotype is housed at the herbarium of the National Museum of Nature and Science. In his 1987 Parmelia monograph, Mason Hale considered Parmelia shinanoana f. calvescens Zahlbruckner (1934) to represent the same species and treated it as a synonym. Zahlbruckner's taxon was based on a collection from Mt Morrison, another historical name for Yu Shan. On morphology and chemistry, he regarded P. niitakana as an East Asian member of Parmelia most akin to the Philippine species P. sectilis, a similarity driven by their unusually large ascospores.

== Description ==
A firm, loosely adnate bark-dweller forming rosettes 6–10 cm across, pale greenish mineral grey. Lobes are more or less linear, closely packed and overlapping, 1.5–3 mm wide. The upper surface is shiny and essentially smooth; pale pores (pseudocyphellae) are arranged in a continuous linear band along the margins, producing a conspicuous 0.1–0.2 mm white rim to each lobe. The lower surface is black and densely rhizinate, with simple to forked rhizines 1–2 mm long. Pycnidia are common and yield cylindrical to faintly spindle-shaped microconidia 5.5–6.5 μm long. Apothecia are frequent, short-stalked and urn-shaped (urceolate) when young, 2–4 mm in diameter; the thalline margin is rugose and subtly lobulate with pseudocyphellae on the ridges. The hymenium is 65–70 μm tall; ascospores are 13–15 × 27–30 μm with a distinct roughly 3 μm epispore. Chemical tests show atranorin, salazinic acid, and consalazinic acid.

== Habitat and distribution ==
Endemic to Taiwan, P. niitakana grows on tree bark at high elevations, probably on most major mountains above 3,000 m.
