= Vitimsky HPP Cascade =

The Vitimsky Hydroelectric Power Plant (HPP) Cascade is a proposed group of hydropower plants on the Vitim River in the Buryatia and Irkutsk regions of Russia.

The first stage consists of the proposed Mokskaya HPP, with a planned capacity of 1,200 MW, and an average annual production of c. 4.54 billion kWh.

The second stage consists of the projected Ivanovo HPP, with a planned capacity of 210 MW, and an average annual production of c. 1.03 billion kWh.

The third stage: the projected Yangudinskaya HPP, with a planned capacity of 360 MW.

The fourth stage: the projected Karalonskaya HPP, with a planned capacity of 450 MW.

The fifth stage: the projected Signayskaya HPP, with a planned capacity of 590 MW.

The sixth stage: the projected Bodaibo HPP, with a planned capacity of 600 MW.
