= Kuanda =

River in southern East Siberia, Russia

Kuanda Куанда
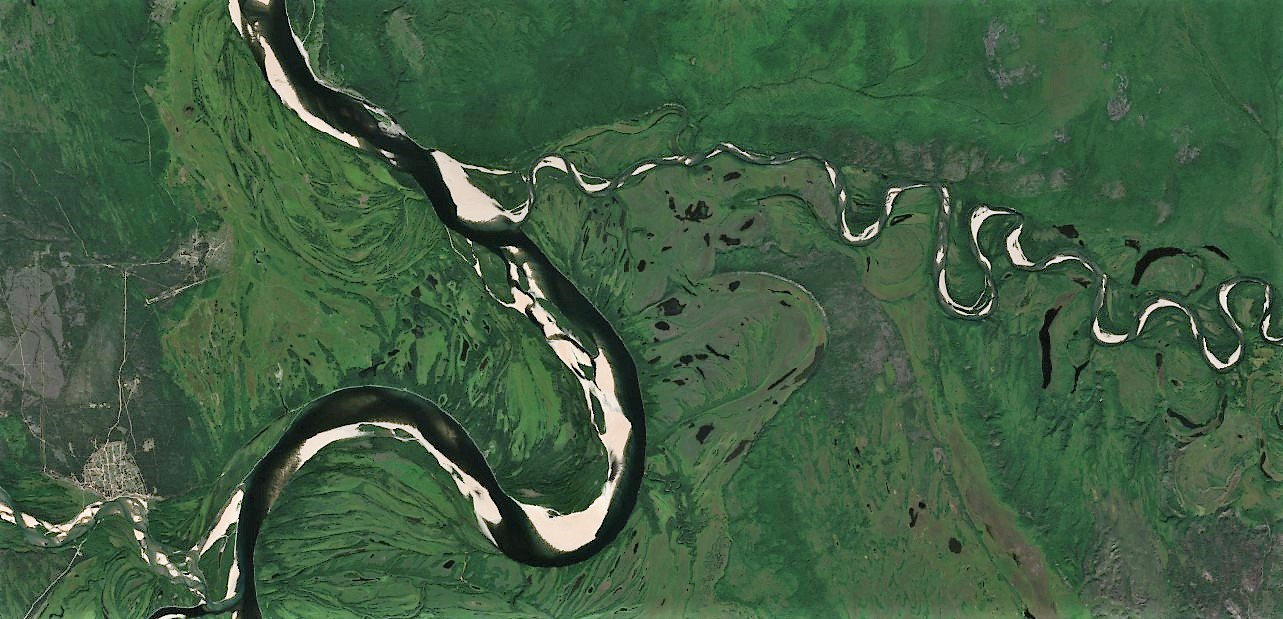
- Last stretch of the Kuanda and its mouth in the Vitim Sentinel-2 image

- Mouth location in Zabaykalsky Krai, Russia

Location
- Country: Russia
- Federal subject: Zabaykalsky Krai

Physical characteristics
- Source: Lake Leprindokan; Kalar Range; South Siberian System
  - coordinates: 56°31′30″N 117°26′30″E
  - elevation: 1,056 m (3,465 ft)
- Mouth: Vitim
  - coordinates: 56°27′45″N 115°46′04″E
- Length: 196 km (122 mi)
- Basin size: 6,530 km^{2} (2,520 sq mi)

Basin features
- Progression: Vitim→ Lena→ Laptev Sea

The Kuanda (Russian: Куанда), also known as Konda, is a river in Zabaykalsky Krai, southern East Siberia, Russia. It is 196 kilometres (122 mi) long, and has a drainage basin of 6,530 square kilometres (2,520 sq mi).

The river flows across sparsely inhabited areas of the Kalarsky District.

== Course ==
The Kuanda is a right tributary of the Vitim. Its sources are in lake Leprindokan at the feet of the Kalar Range, one of the subranges of the Stanovoy Highlands. The river flows in a roughly western direction in a narrow valley across mountainous terrain. Then the valley widens and the river flows within a 9 km (5.6 mi) to 11 km (6.8 mi) wide tectonic basin. Its floodplain is swampy. Downstream from the mouth of the Namarakit, it flows through a narrow gorge with steep over 300 m (980 ft) high banks. Finally it meets the right bank of the Vitim 705 kilometres (438 mi) from its mouth in the Lena. The confluence of the Kuanda is just a little downstream from the mouth of the Muya in the opposite bank of the Vitim.

=== Tributaries ===
The longest tributaries of the Kuanda are the 127 kilometres (79 mi) long Syulban (Сюльбан) and the 88 kilometres (55 mi) long Kuda Malaya on the right, as well as the 68 kilometres (42 mi) long Namarakit and the 65 kilometres (40 mi) long Eimnakh on the left.

== See also ==
- List of rivers of Russia
