= Nipponoparmelia =

Scientific classification
- Kingdom: Fungi
- Division: Ascomycota
- Class: Lecanoromycetes
- Order: Lecanorales
- Family: Parmeliaceae
- Genus: Nipponoparmelia (Kurok.) K.H.Moon, Y.Ohmura & Kashiw. (2010)

Type species
- Nipponoparmelia laevior (Nyl.) K.H.Moon, Y.Ohmura & Kashiw. (2010)

Species
- N. isidioclada N. laevior N. perplicata N. pseudolaevior N. ricasolioides

Synonyms
- Parmelia subgen. Nipponoparmelia Kurok. (1994)

Genus of lichen-forming fungi

Nipponoparmelia is a small genus of five foliose lichens in the family Parmeliaceae. It was proposed by Syo Kurokawa in 1994 as a subgenus of Parmelia and raised to generic rank in 2010 as part of a molecular work that recovered a monophyletic East Asian clade distinct from Parmelia sensu stricto; N. laevior is the type species. Species share grey to brownish thalli with minute, point-like pseudocyphellae on the lobe margins, which are tiny aeration pores limited to the edges rather than the main thallus surface. They also have a black lower surface with simple to sparsely forked rhizines, and chemistry typical of parmelioid lichens. Most species are epiphytes on tree bark in mixed and montane forests, only occasionally occurring on rock. The genus ranges from Japan, Taiwan and China through South Korea and the southern Russian Far East, south to the Philippines via N. isidioclada, and west to the eastern Himalaya (Bhutan, north-east India and Nepal), where N. ricasolioides grows at about 2,700–3,000 m.

== Taxonomy ==
Syo Kurokawa established Parmelia subgen. Nipponoparmelia for a cohesive set of smooth-thallus East Asian taxa in 1994. A broad, gene-based classification published in 2010 showed that several East Asian "Parmelia" (including P. laevior, P. pseudolaevior and P. isidioclada) form a well-supported clade separate from true Parmelia, corroborating recognition of Nipponoparmelia at generic rank. The fifth species, N. perplicata, was described in 2013 from eastern Asia.

== Description ==
The thalli of Nipponoparmelia lichens are foliose, grey to brownish-grey, typically to about 15 cm across, with narrow lobes; the diagnostic tiny, punctiform pseudocyphellae are restricted to lobe and lobule margins and are absent from the lamina, unlike the pattern seen in Punctelia and Flavopunctelia, two other Parmeliaceae genera that feature pseudocyphellae as a diagnostic character. The lower surface is black with simple to sparsely forked rhizines. Apothecia (fruiting bodies) are stalked (stipitate) and urn-shaped (urceolate) when young, later expanding into broad discs. Its conidia (asexual spores) are short-cylindrical. The pseudocyphellae function in gas exchange and, in this genus, their marginal position is a consistent character. Chemistry is uniform at the genus level but shows modest species-level variation: the cortex contains atranorin (often with chloroatranorin), while the medulla usually contains salazinic acid (± consalazinic acid), with reports of trace protocetraric acid in N. perplicata. Chemical spot test reactions reflect this profile; for example, cortex K+, medulla K+ yellow→red, P+ yellow to orange.

== Habitat and distribution ==
Nipponoparmelia is distributed across East Asia and extends into the eastern Himalaya. Japan, China (including Taiwan) and South Korea all have records for the genus, and it ranges north through the southern Russian Far East—Amur Oblast, Jewish Autonomous Oblast, Khabarovsk Krai, Primorsky Krai and Sakhalin Region— with an outlying record from the Kuril Islands. The genus also reaches the Philippines via N. isidioclada, while its western limit is the eastern Himalaya, where N. ricasolioides occurs in Nepal, India (Arunachal Pradesh, Manipur) and Bhutan.

These lichens are predominantly epiphytic, growing on the bark of coniferous and broad-leaved trees in mixed and montane forests. Within this range, habitats span from low elevations in Japan to roughly 2,700–3,000 m in the eastern Himalaya for N. ricasolioides. In the Russian Far East they occur in mixed conifer–broadleaf, fir–spruce and larch forests, and some species (e.g., N. laevior, N. pseudolaevior) can also grow on rock as well as bark.

== Species ==
- Nipponoparmelia isidioclada (Vain.) K.H.Moon, Y.Ohmura & Kashiw. (2010) – East Asia incl. Philippines and Russian Far East
- Nipponoparmelia laevior (Nyl.) K.H.Moon, Y.Ohmura & Kashiw. (2010) – type species; widespread in East Asia
- Nipponoparmelia perplicata S.Y.Kondr., Tschab., Elix & Hur (2014) – South Korea and Russian Far East
- Nipponoparmelia pseudolaevior (Asahina) K.H.Moon, Y.Ohmura & Kashiw. (2010) – Japan, S Korea, Russian Far East
- Nipponoparmelia ricasolioides (Nyl.) A.Crespo & Divakar (2010) – eastern Himalaya
