= Muya (river) =

Muya Муя
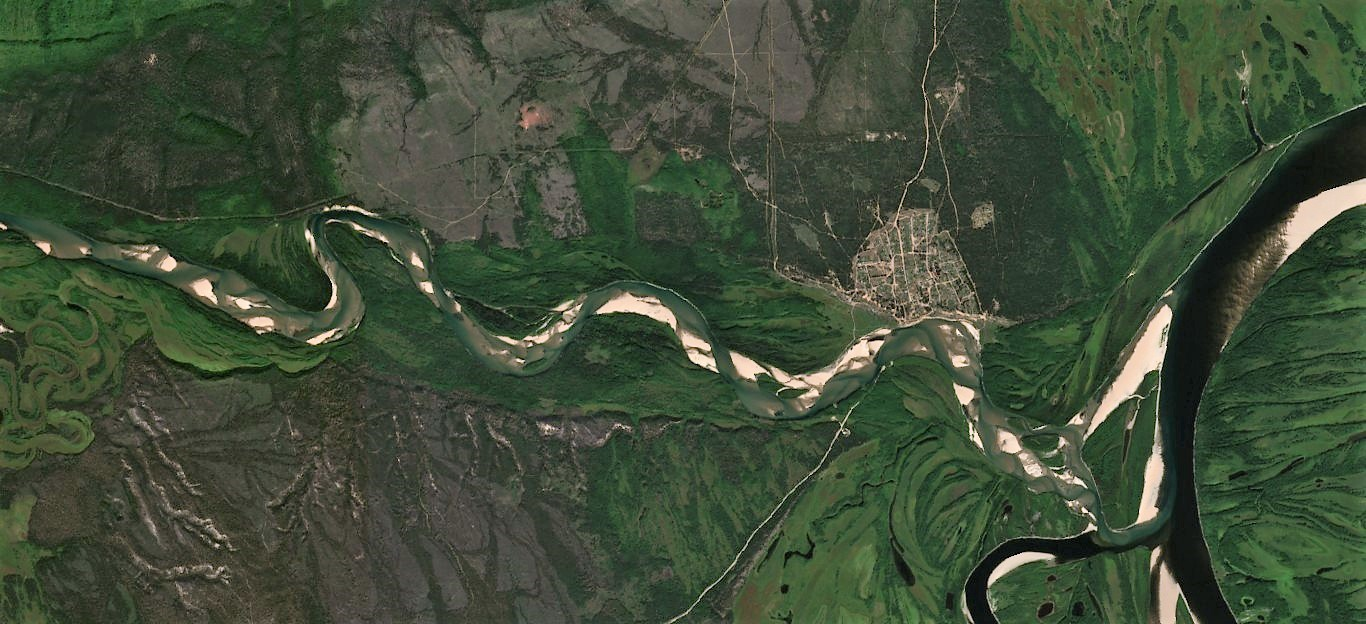
- Last stretch of the Muya and mouth in the Vitim Sentinel-2 image.

- Mouth location in Buryatia, Russia

Location
- Country: Russia
- Republic: Buryatia

Physical characteristics
- Source: Northern Muya Range
  - coordinates: 55°49′32″N 112°34′51″E
  - elevation: 1,700 m (5,600 ft)
- Mouth: Vitim
  - location: Ust-Muya
  - coordinates: 56.4047°N 115.6723°E
  - elevation: 467 m (1,532 ft)
- Length: 365 km (227 mi)
- Basin size: 11,900 km^{2} (4,600 sq mi)

Basin features
- Progression: Vitim→ Lena→ Laptev Sea

The Muya (Russian: Муя) is a left tributary of the Vitim in Buryatia, Russia. It is 365 kilometres (227 mi) long and has a drainage basin of 11,900 square kilometres (4,600 sq mi).

The area through which the river flows is sparsely populated, the only settlement on the river being Taksimo, with the village of Ust-Muya located where the river flows into the Vitim, nearly opposite from the mouth of the Kuanda in the facing bank. The Muya is navigable for small craft from the Vitim around 70 kilometres (43 mi) to Taksimo.

The Muya has lent its name to a number of other geographic features, including the Northern Muya Range, the Southern Muya Range, the Muya-Kuanda Depression, as well as the local Muya District.

== Tributaries ==
The longest tributary of the Muya is the 180 kilometres (110 mi) long Muyakan on the left.

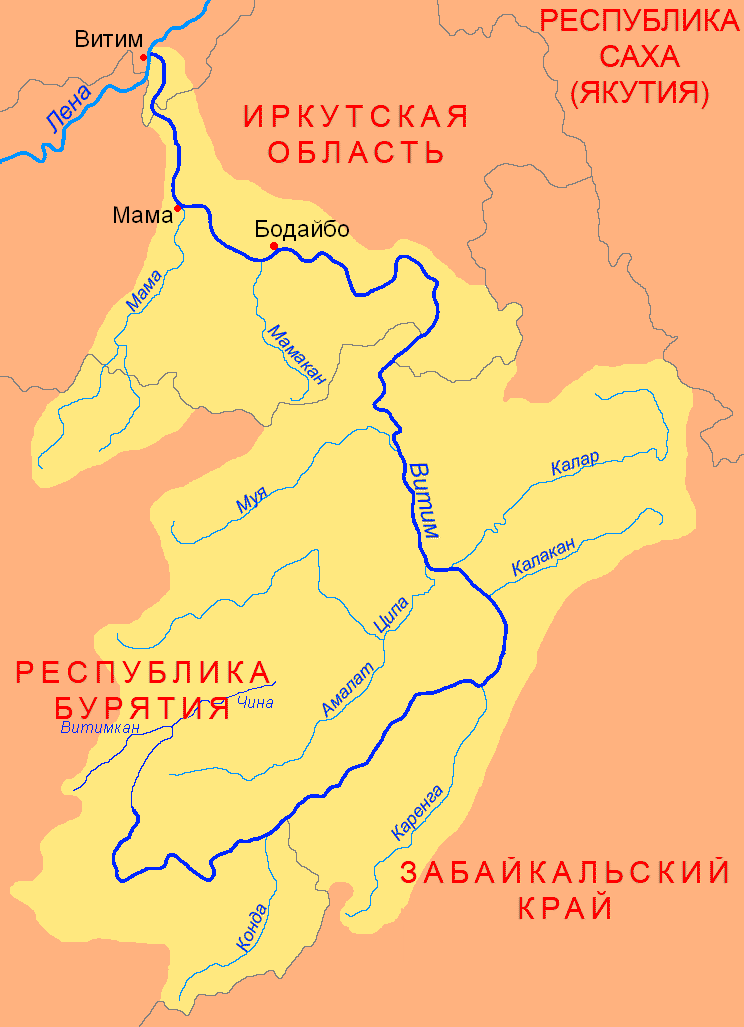
Basin of the Vitim

== See also ==
- List of rivers of Russia
