= Aeroflot Flight 498 =

1981 aviation accident

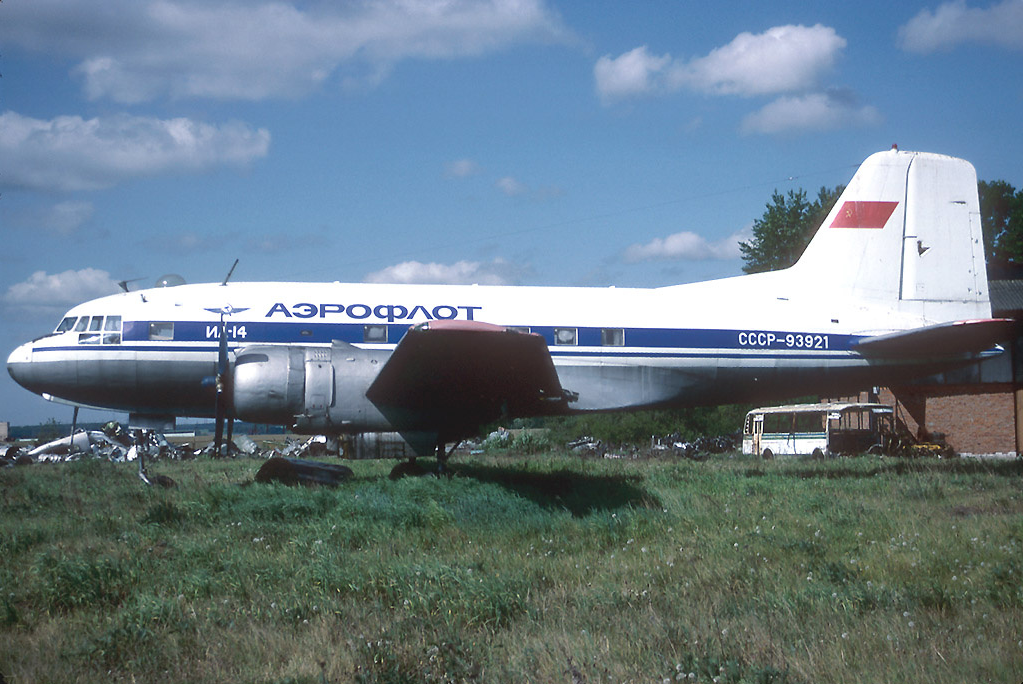
- An Aeroflot Ilyushin Il-14M, similar to the one involved in the crash

Accident
- Date: 14 June 1981
- Summary: Controlled flight into terrain due to crew error
- Site: Holy Nose Peninsula in Lake Baikal, 30 kilometres (19 mi) northwest of Ust-Barguzin, Barguzinsky District, Buryat Autonomous Soviet Socialist Republic, Russian SSR, USSR; 53°37′N 108°44′E

Aircraft
- Aircraft type: Ilyushin Il-14M
- Operator: Aeroflot
- Registration: CCCP-41838
- Flight origin: Severomuysk
- Stopover: Nizhneangarsk Airport
- Destination: Baikal International Airport
- Occupants: 48
- Passengers: 44
- Crew: 4
- Fatalities: 48
- Survivors: 0

Aeroflot Flight 498 was a domestic passenger flight from Severomuysk to Baikal International Airport in Ulan-Ude, with a stopover at Nizhneangarsk Airport in Nizhneangarsk. On 14 June 1981, the Ilyushin Il-14 operating this route crashed near Lake Baikal en route to its planned stopover in Nizhneangarsk. All 44 passengers and 4 crew members on board were killed, and the aircraft was destroyed. It remains the deadliest crash involving an Ilyushin Il-14.

== Aircraft ==
CCCP-41838 was an Ilyushin Il-14M manufactured on 1 January 1957, with 16,185 total air hours and 18,427 cycles. The aircraft was equipped with engines registered as B B 29471633 252073177. At the time of the crash it was being operated by the East Siberia Civil Aviation Directorate of Ulan-Ude under Aeroflot.

== Flight description ==
The crew consisted of Captain Alex T Mordovia, co-pilot Alexander Lobsonovich Kyrmygenov, and Flight Engineer Alexander Zharnikov. Aeroflot Flight 498 was originally scheduled to fly from Severomuysk to Baikal International Airport in Ulan-Ude, with a planned stopover at Nizhneangarsk Airport in Nizhneangarsk. The flight had exceeded its takeoff weight capacity by 186 kilograms (410 lb). The aircraft left from Severomuysk at 09:41 MSK.

Due to bad weather, Nizhneangarsk Airport closed, and the crew rerouted the aircraft to land at an airfield in nearby Ust-Barguzin. Mountains surrounding Lake Baikal were at that time obscured by the cloud cover, and visibility was only about 5 kilometres (3.1 mi) with rain and winds of up to 5 metres per second (11 mph). Foggy conditions and low visibility were likewise reported on Holy Nose Peninsula, what would later become the aircraft's crash site. At 10:30 MSK, almost an hour after takeoff, the crew reported a nearby flight, and at 10:41 began communications with the air tower at Ulan-Barguzin in preparation for landing. Conditions around the Ust-Barguzin airfield were slightly more favorable than had been projected at the aircraft's height. At 11:02 the aircraft called in to report their location, but in violation of air rules, the crew instead called the air control tower at Ulan-Ude and did not report back to Ust-Barguzin. Additionally, they did not report their location or weather conditions. The aircraft's data finder, ARP-6, was found to be unstable, about which the Ust-Barguzin air tower warned Flight 498 well in advance. Due to the faulty equipment, the flight deviated to the right from its course about 32 kilometres (20 mi). At 11:16, the aircraft descended from a height of 3,600 metres (11,800 ft) to 2,700 metres (8,900 ft).Shortly before the crash, the flight crew intentionally misinformed the flight deck that the airfield was in sight, and the air tower gave them visual instructions on landing; the crew accepted these instructions at 11:21, without actually being in sight of the air field. The pilot then mistook the Holy Nose Peninsula for the location of the air field.

At 11:22 MSK, the aircraft crashed 1,300 metres (4,300 ft) above sea level on the side of a mountain located on the Holy Nose Peninsula in Lake Baikal, about 30 kilometres (19 mi) from the Ust-Barguzin airfield. The flight crashed at a 10-degree angle to the left and an angle of trajectory of 2 or 3 degrees. All 48 people—44 passengers (including 13 children) and 4 crew members—were killed during the crash, and the aircraft was a total loss. Much of the equipment was destroyed in the crash, making the exact cause of the accident difficult to pinpoint. Among this equipment was the radio compass ARC-5, making its efficiency impossible to determine. Ultimately, the crash was attributed to passive piloting and pilot error.
