= Nipponoparmelia ricasolioides =

Scientific classification
- Kingdom: Fungi
- Division: Ascomycota
- Class: Lecanoromycetes
- Order: Lecanorales
- Family: Parmeliaceae
- Genus: Nipponoparmelia
- Species: N. ricasolioides

Binomial name
- Nipponoparmelia ricasolioides (Nyl.) A.Crespo & Divakar (2010)

Synonyms
- Parmelia ricasolioides Nyl. (1887)

Species of lichen-forming fungus

Nipponoparmelia ricasolioides is a species of foliose lichen in the family Parmeliaceae. It was formally described in 1887 by William Nylander from specimens collected on tree trunks in Yunnan, China, at about 3,000 metres elevation. The lichen is characterised by its greyish, leafy thallus with short, crowded lobes, numerous reddish apothecia with inrolled margins, and a black lower surface densely covered with rhizines. It grows on bark in montane temperate forests of the eastern Himalayas, including Bhutan, Nepal, and parts of India and China.

== Taxonomy ==
It was described as a new species in 1887 by William Nylander, as Parmelia ricasolioides. The type specimen was collected from trunks of trees in Yunnan, China, at about 3,000 m elevation. Mason Hale cited Nylander's Yunnan gathering as the lectotype (H, Nylander Herbarium no. 35283), with isolectotypes at PC and TUR. He described a moderately sized, glaucous-grey, lobed thallus that is blackish and rhizinate beneath, with crowded, reddish, concave apothecia 2–3 mm across whose margins are slightly scalloped and often bent inward. The ascospores (numbering eight per ascus) are ellipsoid, 16–20 × 9–11 μm; in iodine the asci stains blue before becoming dingy (an amyloid reaction). With potassium hydroxide solution the medulla turns yellow and then rusty red (K+ yellow→red). Nylander also recorded rod-shaped conidia about 5–6 μm long, and considered the species part of the P. perlata group and somewhat allied to P. tenuirima. In 1930, Alexander Zahlbruckner published Parmelia daliensis and P. daliensis f. tardiva from Yunnan; both were placed in synonymy with P. ricasolioides by Hale. Hale considered the species to occupy an isolated position within Parmelia sensu lato and noted the very weak development of marginal pseudocyphellae as a diagnostic feature.

A 2010 revision of parmelioid lichens separated Parmelia ricasolioides from Parmelia based on molecular evidence showing it clusters within a distinct East Asian lineage. Morphological re-evaluation supported this result: the species exhibits the diagnostic Nipponoparmelia features of grey to brownish thalli, punctiform (point-like) pseudocyphellae restricted to lobe edges, and simple rhizines. These combined molecular and structural traits led to its formal transfer to Nipponoparmelia.

== Description ==
Nipponoparmelia ricasolioides forms a foliose (leafy) thallus that is closely to rather loosely attached (adnate) to bark and becomes brittle when dry. In the herbarium it appears brownish mineral grey and is typically 6–8 cm across. The lobes are short, fairly even and crowded, lying edge-to-edge, 2–3 mm wide. The upper surface is shiny, flat to slightly wrinkled (rugose), and continuous. Pseudocyphellae are tiny breaks in the surface that act as aeration pores. They are inconspicuous, confined to the lobe margins and elongated. The lower surface is black and densely covered with rhizines (fine, root-like holdfasts), which are simple to forked and 0.5–1 mm long.

Small black pycnidia are common; they produce straight, cylindrical conidia about 5–6 μm long. Apothecia are often numerous, short-stalked or nearly stalkless (substipitate), 1–2 mm in diameter, with an inrolled, shallowly scalloped rim (crenate). The spore-bearing layer (hymenium) is about 55 μm tall, and the ascospores are broadly ellipsoid, 9–13 × 20–24 μm, with a spore wall (episporium) about 2 μm thick. The major lichen substances detected are atranorin and salazinic acid.

== Habitat and distribution ==
A montane species of the eastern Himalaya, it occurs in temperate forest belts. In Bhutan it has been recorded from Chilaila, Dochola, and the Phajoding–Chokhortse area. It is also reported across the eastern Himalayas, including India, where confirmed localities include Arunachal Pradesh and Manipur, and Nepal. Records come from the temperate zone at around 2,700 m elevation.
