= Mamakan (river) =

Mamakan Мамакан
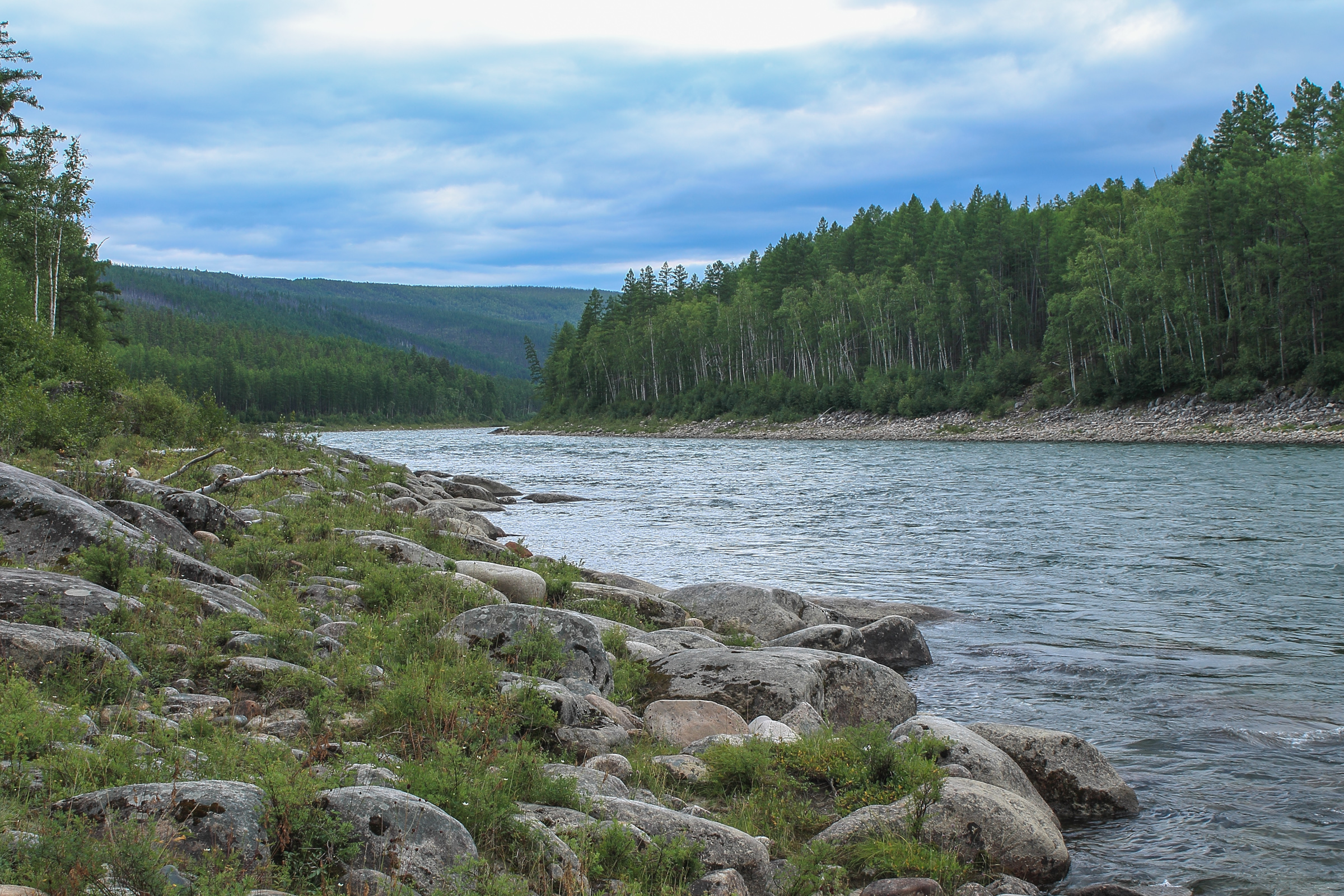
- View of the river in mid-course

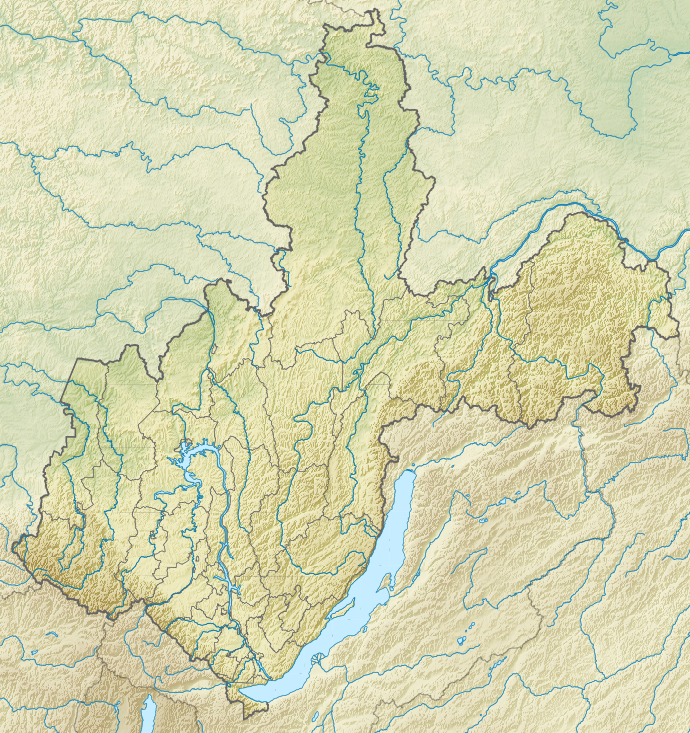
- Mouth location in Irkutsk Oblast, Russia

Location
- Country: Russia
- Federal subject: Irkutsk Oblast

Physical characteristics
- Source: Northern Muya Range; Stanovoy Highlands
  - coordinates: 56°41′39″N 114°12′10″E
  - elevation: 1,672 m (5,486 ft)
- Mouth: Vitim
  - coordinates: 57°49′06″N 114°01′50″E
  - elevation: 244 m (801 ft)
- Length: 209 km (130 mi)
- Basin size: 9,460 km^{2} (3,650 sq mi)
- Discharge
  - average: 164 m^{3}/s (5,800 cu ft/s)

Basin features
- Progression: Vitim→ Lena→ Laptev Sea

The Mamakan (Russian: Мамакан) is a river in Irkutsk Oblast, southern East Siberia, Russia. It is a tributary of the Vitim of the Lena basin. The river is 209 kilometres (130 mi) long, and has a drainage basin of 9,460 square kilometres (3,650 sq mi). There are no settlements by the river, only Mamakan near its mouth by the Vitim.

The Mamakan reservoir, the world's first hydroelectric power plant built on permafrost, is located in the lower course of the river, about 10 kilometres (6.2 mi) from Bodaybo.

== Course ==
The Mamakan is a left tributary of the Vitim. Its sources are in the Northern Muya Range, a subrange of the Stanovoy Highlands, at the northeastern limit of the Upper Angara Range. In its upper course it is known as the Sredny Mamakan (Middle Mamakan). The river flows roughly in a northwestward direction and is joined by the Left Mamakan and the Right Mamakan. It cuts across the Delyun-Uran Range (Делюн-Уранский хребет) and flows northwards. Finally near the Mamakan settlement it meets the Vitim 282 kilometres (175 mi) from its mouth in the Lena.

The tributaries of the Mamakan are the Telmama, Tamarak, Right Mamakan, Kaalu and Sira from the right, and the Mamachek, Dodykta, Ikibzyak, Bugorikhta, Left Mamakan and Dylgdaisi from the left. The river is frozen between October and May.

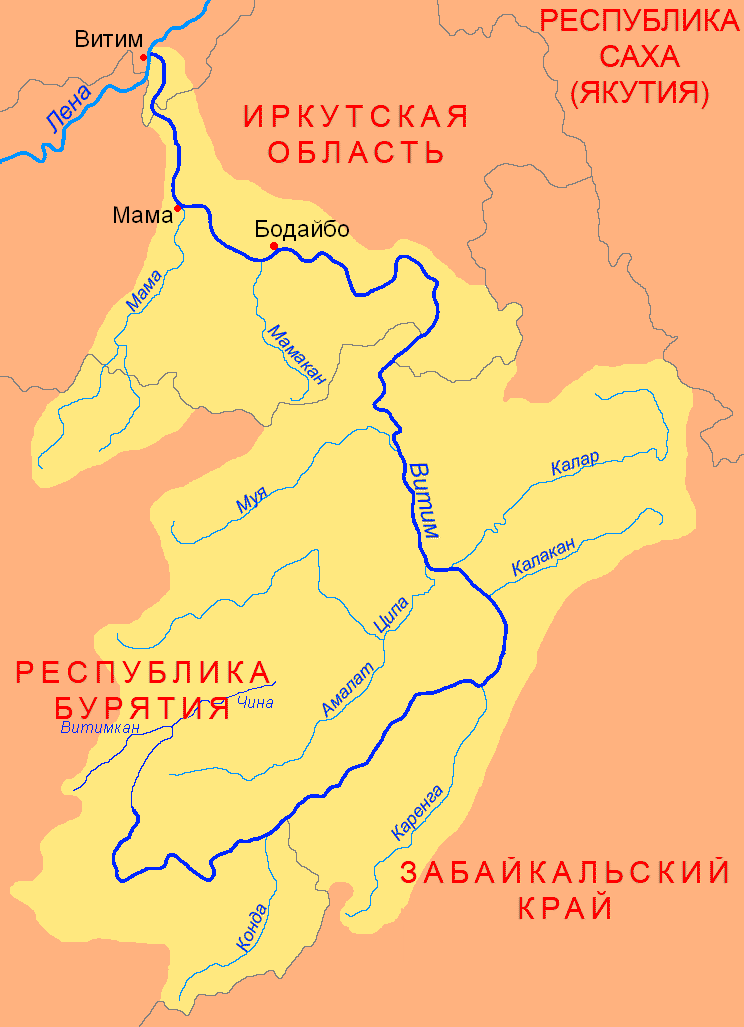
Basin of the Vitim with the Mamakan in the upper part.

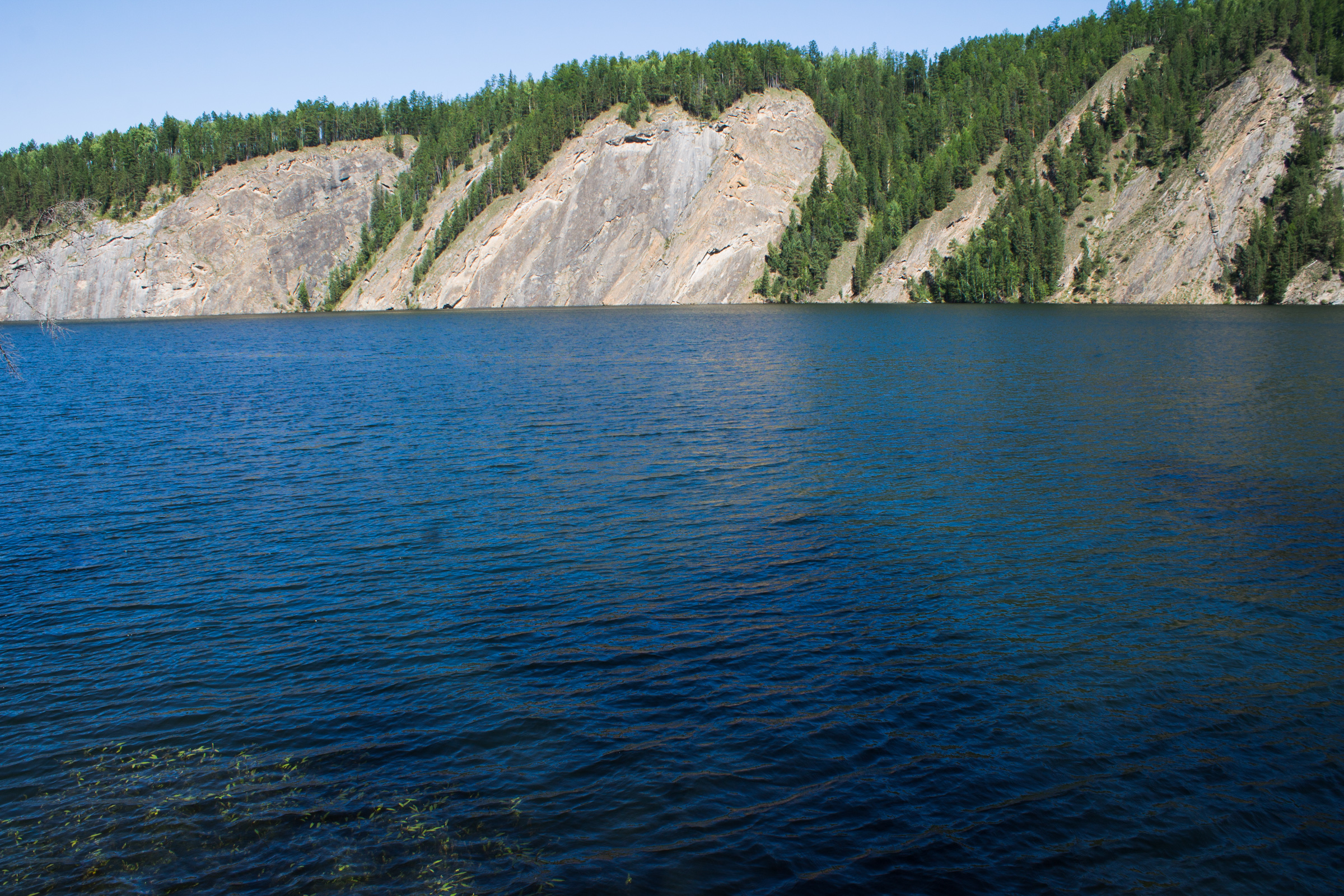
View of the shores of the Mamakan reservoir.

== See also ==
- List of rivers of Russia
