= Northern Muya Range =

Mountain range in Russia

Northern Muya Range Се́веро-Му́йский хребе́т
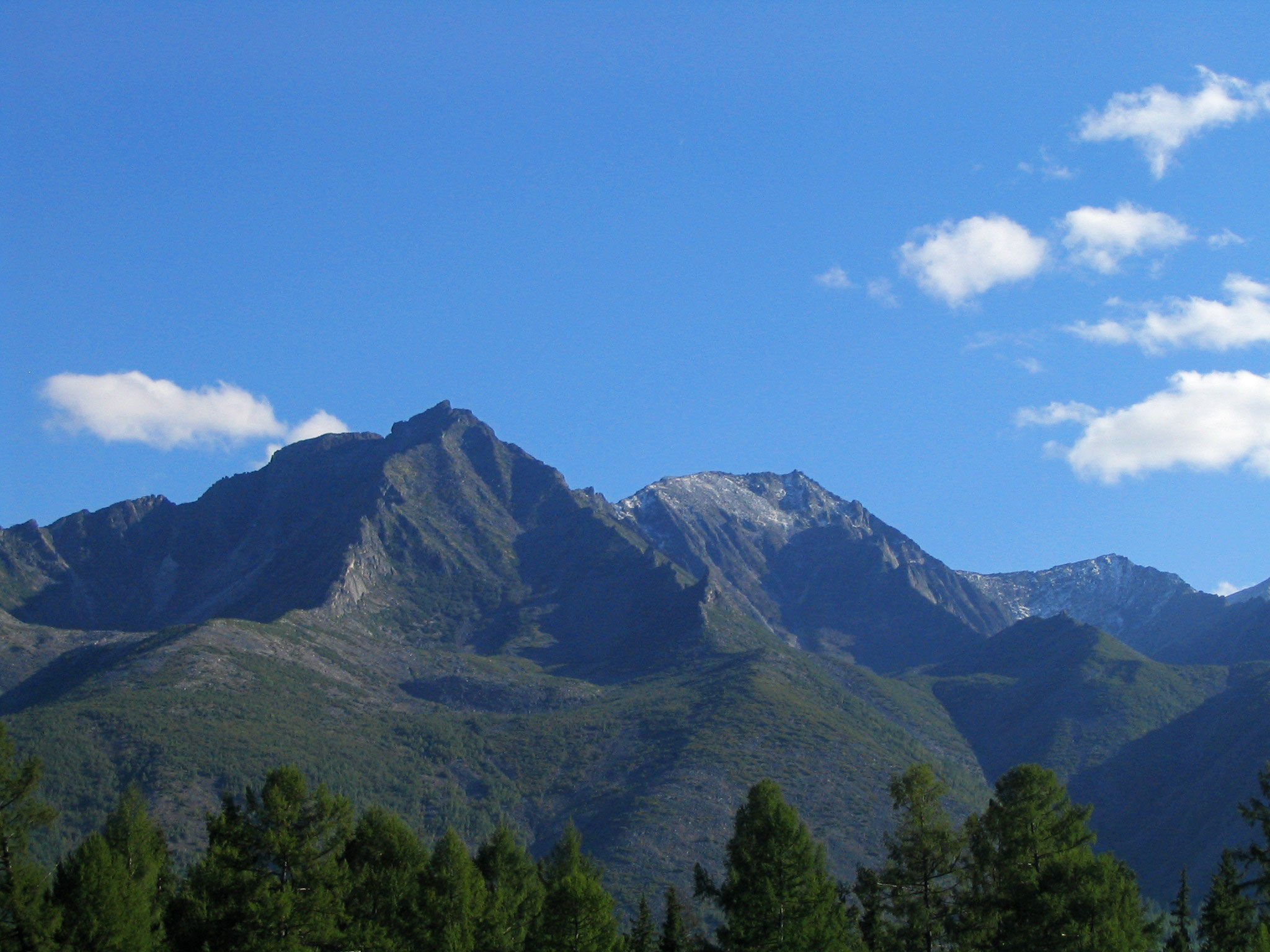
- View of the Northern Muya Range from a train on the Baikal Amur Mainline.

Highest point
- Elevation: 2,537 m (8,323 ft)
- Coordinates: 55°47′19″N 111°40′45″E

Dimensions
- Length: 350 km (220 mi) ENE-WSW

Geography
- Location within Republic of Buryatia
- Country: Russia
- Federal subject: Buryatia / Irkutsk Oblast
- Range coordinates: 56°5′0″N 114°30′0″E
- Parent range: Stanovoy Highlands; South Siberian System

Geology
- Rock type(s): Granites, crystalline schistss

The Northern Muya Range (Russian: Се́веро-Му́йский хребе́т, romanized: Severo-Muyskiy khrebet) is a mountain range in Buryatia, Russia, part of the Stanovoy Highlands.

The Baikal Amur Mainline (BAM) railway traverses the southern end of the mountain range via the Severomuysky Tunnel.

== Geography ==
The Northern Muya Range stretches from the valley of the Svetlaya river, a left tributary of the Upper Angara, in the southwest, to the valley of the Vitim in the northeast. The Upper Angara Depression lies to the northwest and the Muya-Kuanda Depression to the southeast. To the north it runs parallel with the Delyun-Uran Range just south of it, and to the south with the Muyakan Range. The highest summit of the range is a 2,537 m (8,323 ft) high mountain located in its extreme southwestern part. Peaks and ridges have sharp glacial shapes in the central sector of the range, while flat summits predominate on the periphery. In its southwestern part the Northern Muya Range is broken by the valley of the Kotera.

=== Hydrography ===
The Northern Muya Range separates the basins of the Upper Angara and Muya Rivers. Among the rivers having their sources in the range are the Upper Angara and its left tributaries Yanchui and Angarakan, several tributaries of the Vitim, such as the Mamakan and Muya. The rivers Parama and Yanguda also originate from it.

== Flora ==
The slopes of the range are mainly covered with larch taiga, with mountain tundra above 1,200 m (3,900 ft). The river valleys are swampy, with meadows and pine forests on the lower slopes and the north-facing sides.

== See also ==
- List of mountains and hills of Russia
- Southern Muya Range
