= Delyun-Uran Range =

Mountain in Russia

Delyun-Uran Range Делюн-Уранский хребет
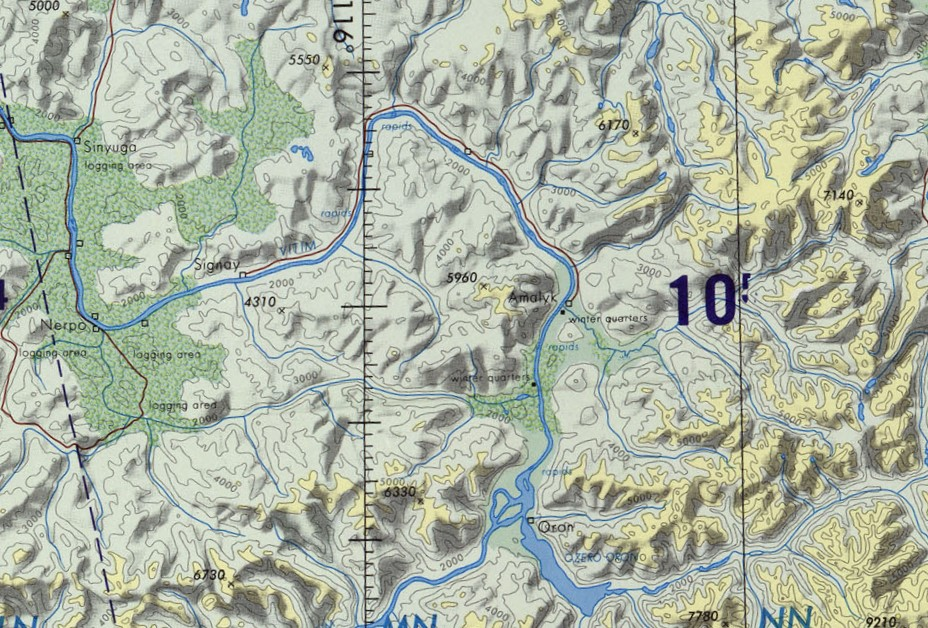
- Delyun-Uran Gorges map section

Highest point
- Peak: Unnamed
- Elevation: 2,337 m (7,667 ft)
- Coordinates: 56°34′20″N 113°48′41″E

Dimensions
- Length: 350 km (220 mi) ENE-WSW
- Width: 80 km (50 mi)

Geography
- Location within Republic of Buryatia
- Country: Russia
- Federal subject: Buryatia / Irkutsk Oblast
- Range coordinates: 56°48′N 114°0′E
- Parent range: Stanovoy Highlands; South Siberian System

Geology
- Orogeny: Alpine orogeny
- Rock age(s): Archean and Proterozoic
- Rock type(s): Schist, gneiss, Limestone

Climbing
- Easiest route: From Bodaybo

The Delyun-Uran Range (Russian: Делюн-Уранский хребет, romanized: Delyun-Uranskiy khrebet) is a mountain range in Irkutsk Oblast and Buryatia, Russia, part of the Stanovoy Highlands.

The nearest airport is Bodaybo Airport.

== History ==
This remote mountain area was first explored by Peter Kropotkin and Ivan Polyakov during the 1866 Olyokma-Vitim expedition of the East Siberian branch of the Imperial Russian Geographical Society. Kropotkin named the range after the area of conspicuous rapids of the Vitim river in the gorge where it crosses the range northwards (Делюн-Уранский порог). He described the range as a "desolate, gloomy place".

The Vitim Nature Reserve was established in the eastern part of the range and neighboring mountainous areas in 1982.

== Geography ==
This mountain range is located in the Baikal Rift Zone and it is part of the Baikal-Stanovoy Region. The Delyun-Uran is the northernmost subrange of the Stanovoy Highlands. It runs roughly parallel to the Northern Muya Range just north of it. The range stretches from southwest to northeast for about 350 km from the Churo River, a tributary of the upper course of the Upper Angara river, to lake Nichatka.

The gorges of the Vitim River are located in the eastern section, dividing the upper course of the Vitim from its lower basin. The western section of the range is in Buryatia and the eastern in Irkutsk Oblast. A small part at the eastern end is in Zabaykalsky Krai. The Vitim crosses the range in its northeastern part. The highest point of the range is a 2,337 metres (7,667 ft) high peak located between the Upper Angara sources and the Mamakan uppermost reaches.

A rare, exposed argillite outcrop is found in the range.

=== Hydrography ===
River Upper Angara, flowing into Lake Baikal, originates in the slopes of the range. The Mamakan cuts across the range. Lake Oron is located south of the eastern section of the range.

== Flora ==
The slopes of the range are mainly covered with mountain taiga, with pre-alpine woodland and mountain tundra at higher elevations.

== See also ==
- List of mountains and hills of Russia
- Northern Muya Range
