= Lake Oron =

Lake in eastern Irkutsk Oblast (Bodaybinsky District), Russia

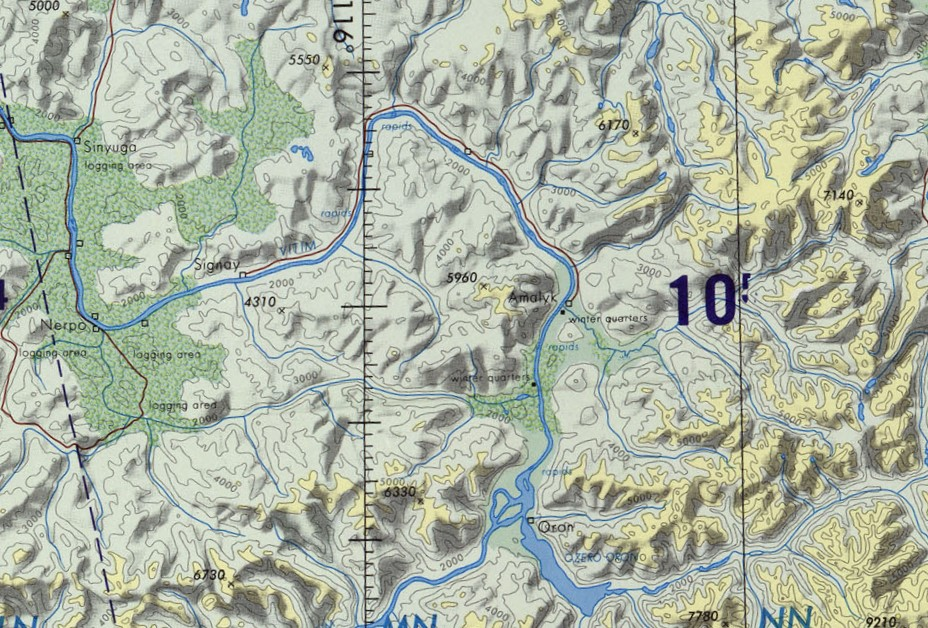
- Delyun-Uran map section with Lake Oron.

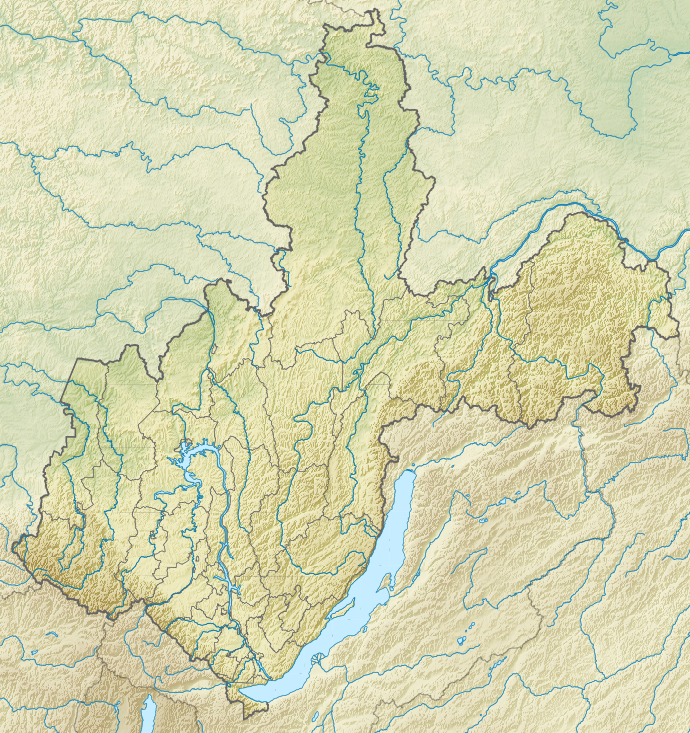
- Location within Irkutsk Oblast
- Location: Siberia, Russia
- Coordinates: 57°6′9″N 116°31′53″E
- Primary inflows: Kamennaya, Kultushnaya, Sygykta
- Primary outflows: Vitim
- Catchment area: 3,570 km^{2} (1,380 sq mi)
- Max. length: 24 km (15 mi)
- Max. width: 6.5 km (4.0 mi)
- Surface area: 51.3 km^{2} (19.8 sq mi)
- Max. depth: 184 m (604 ft)
- Surface elevation: 353 m (1,158 ft)

Lake Oron (Russian: озеро Орон, romanized: Ozero Oron) is a lake in eastern Irkutsk Oblast (Bodaybinsky District), Russia.

== Geography ==
It is located in the Kodar Mountains, to the south of the southern slopes of the Delyun-Uran Range. Lake Oron is connected to the Vitim River via a short waterway.

=== Hydrography ===
Lake Oron sits at an elevation of 353 meters (1,158 ft) above sea level. It is 24 kilometers (15 mi) long and 6.5 kilometers (4.0 mi) wide, with a surface area of 51.3 square kilometers (19.8 sq mi) and a maximum depth of 184 meters (604 ft). The western and eastern slopes of the lake are practically vertical, and 85 percent of the lake is of a depth greater than 100 meters (330 ft), while the northern part of the lake that connects to the Vitim River is more shallow, with depths up to 18 meters (59 ft). The presence of deep faults beneath Lake Oron strongly suggest that the lake has a tectonic origin, with a hydrological regime determined more by changes in precipitation than by glacier meltwater.

== See also ==
- List of lakes of Russia
