= Muja =

Muja or MUJA may refer to:

== Places ==
- Muja, Ethiopia, a town
- Muja, Western Australia, town in the Shire of Collie, Western Australia
  - Muja Power Station, in Muja, Western Australia
- Ichigkat muja – Cordillera del Condor National Park, a protected area in Peru
- Jurassic Museum of Asturias (MUJA), Jurassic Museum of Asturias, Spain

== People ==
- Alban Muja, Kosovo artist and film-maker
- Arbnor Muja, Kosovan professional footballer
- Arta Muja, German model
- Muja Messiah, American rapper

== Other uses ==
- Muja (alligator), an American alligator living in the Belgrade Zoo and is the oldest known alligator in captivity
- Muja, a 2009 EP by Avicii
- Muja Kina, a character from Yandere Simulator
