= Mamakan, Silvaneh =

Mamakan ممكان
- Village
- Location within Iran
- Coordinates: 37°20′11″N 44°57′30″E
- Country: Iran
- Province: West Azerbaijan
- County: Urmia
- Bakhsh: Silvaneh
- Rural District: Margavar

Population (2006)
  - Total: 640
- Time zone: UTC+3:30 (IRST)
  - Summer (DST): UTC+4:30 (IRDT)

Mamakan (Persian: ممكان, also Romanized as Mamakān) is a village in Margavar Rural District, Silvaneh District, Urmia County, West Azerbaijan Province, Iran. At the 2006 census, its population was 640, in 98 families.
