= Nipponoparmelia perplicata =

Scientific classification
- Kingdom: Fungi
- Division: Ascomycota
- Class: Lecanoromycetes
- Order: Lecanorales
- Family: Parmeliaceae
- Genus: Nipponoparmelia
- Species: N. perplicata

Binomial name
- Nipponoparmelia perplicata S.Y.Kondr., Tschab., Elix & Hur (2014)

Species of lichen-forming fungus

Nipponoparmelia perplicata is a species of corticolous (bark-dwelling) foliose lichen in the family Parmeliaceae. It was formally described in 2014 from specimens collected on mountain forests in South Korea. The lichen is characterised by its distinctive short, narrow lobes with downturned margins that give a helmet-shaped appearance, and by its lack of vegetative propagules such as soredia or isidia. It grows on the bark of deciduous and evergreen trees in cool montane forests, typically at elevations between 700 and 1,700 metres. The species is known from South Korea and Russia (including Sakhalin and the Kuril Islands), where it inhabits well-forested upland areas.

== Taxonomy ==
Nipponoparmelia perplicata was described in 2013 from eastern Asia by the lichenologists Sergey Kondratyuk, Svetlana Tchabanenko, John Elix, and Jae-Seoun Hur. The type was gathered on Mt Jiri (South Korea) from the bark of Malus baccata at 1,755 m elevation. The epithet perplicata refers to the species' subdued, difficult-to-see pore openings (pseudocyphellae). Within Nipponoparmelia, a genus segregated from Parmelia for East Asian taxa with point-like (punctiform) pseudocyphellae along lobe margins, the new species is diagnosed by shorter, narrower lobes whose tips turn down to give a "helmet-shaped" look, and by broader spores. It differs from the widespread N. laevior in these smaller, down-folded lobes, in having pseudocyphellae that are larger yet inconspicuous and best seen from the margin or underside, and in having wider ascospores (about 13–17 × 8–11 μm, versus 12–16 × 6–9 μm in N. laevior).

Among others in its genus lacking vegetative propagules, N. perplicata is distinguished by the combination of irregular lobes with margins folded downwards and pseudocyphellae that are indistinct from above but clearer from beneath. It contrasts with N. pseudolaevior, which has abundant, finger-like isidia (small, upright outgrowths used for vegetative reproduction), and with N. isidioclada, which develops coralloid isidioid growths and a different chemistry. In a regional key, N. perplicata is the only Russian species without isidia or lobules and with short, irregular lobes whose margins are turned down; the indistinct pseudocyphellae are best seen on the underside of those down-turned margins, whereas N. laevior has elongate, slightly concave lobes with clear marginal pseudocyphellae, and N. pseudolaevior and N. isidioclada both bear isidia (the latter also with gyrophoric acid).

== Description ==
The thallus of Nipponoparmelia perplicata is foliose, typically 5–8 cm across, and is closely attached to the substrate. The upper surface is dark greenish to olive-grey or whitish mineral grey, matt to slightly shiny. Lobes are short, to about 4–7 mm long, and 1–3 mm wide, arranged side-by-side and often appearing slightly convex because the lobe edges are turned down. The thallus lacks soredia and isidia (the two common types of vegetative propagules), an important field clue. Pseudocyphellae (tiny breaks in the upper cortex that act as gas exchange pores) are punctiform to short fissures about 0.6–1(–1.5) mm, mainly along lobe margins and often easier to see on the lobe underside than on the upper surface. The medulla is white. The lower thallus surface is black with a paler to brownish marginal zone and bears simple to forked rhizines (root-like holdfasts). Pycnidia and conidia have not been observed, and the photobiont is Trebouxia.

Fruiting bodies (apothecia) may be frequent, stalked to sessile, 2–7 mm across, with a brown to dark brown disc and a thalline margin that can show small pits and raised punctiform pseudocyphellae on its inner face. Ascospores are broadly ellipsoid, usually 13–17 × 8–11 μm (occasionally as small as 10 × 7 μm or as large as 17 × 12 μm). Standard spot tests: cortex K+ (yellow soon brownish), C−, KC−, Pd+ (yellow); medulla K+ (yellow then red), C−, Pd+ (deep yellow slowly turning orange). Major substances are atranorin and chloroatranorin in the cortex, and salazinic acid (with traces of consalazinic and protocetraric acids) in the medulla.

== Habitat and distribution ==
An epiphyte of cool, montane forests, N. perplicata grows on the bark and twigs of deciduous and evergreen trees (e.g., Malus, Quercus, Rhododendron, Betula), typically from roughly 700 to 1,700 m elevation. In Russia it grows as an epiphyte in mixed forests and tends to occupy relatively open situations, often near streams. Collections in Korea include several mountain localities (e.g., Mt Jiri, Mt Sorak, Mt Naejang, Mt Gaya, Mt Hambaek, Mt Deogyo), indicating a preference for well-forested uplands. It has also been confirmed from the Kuril Islands on Iturup, where material was collected in August 2023 on the eastern slope of the Berutarube volcano, including sites in the Andrey Creek valley.

In Russia the species was previously known from Shikotan Island and Sakhalin; the Iturup record extends its Kuril range and the authors note it as rare in the Russian Far East. On the eastern slope of Berutarube, lichen communities in the forest belt showed no detectable impact from solfataric gases (primarily sulfur dioxide and hydrogen sulfide), indicating that N. perplicata there occurs in ordinary forest habitats rather than on substrates affected by fumarolic activity.
