= Nipponoparmelia isidioclada =

Scientific classification
- Kingdom: Fungi
- Division: Ascomycota
- Class: Lecanoromycetes
- Order: Lecanorales
- Family: Parmeliaceae
- Genus: Nipponoparmelia
- Species: N. isidioclada

Binomial name
- Nipponoparmelia isidioclada (Vain.) K.H.Moon, Y.Ohmura & Kashiw. (2010)

Synonyms
- Parmelia isidioclada Vain. (1921); Parmelia yasudae Räsänen (1940); Parmelia psoromoides Räsänen (1949); Parmelia sectilis Hale (1968)

Species of lichen-forming fungus

Nipponoparmelia isidioclada is a species of foliose lichen in the family Parmeliaceae. Originally described from Japan in 1921 as Parmelia isidioclada, this lichen was transferred to the genus Nipponoparmelia in 2010 following molecular studies that revealed its placement within an East Asian evolutionary lineage distinct from true Parmelia species. The species has been recorded from Japan, China, Taiwan, the Philippines, and the Russian Far East, where it grows as an epiphyte on the bark of conifer and broad-leaved trees in mixed forests.

== Taxonomy ==
Edvard August Vainio introduced the species in 1921 as Parmelia isidioclada, diagnosing it by an irregularly lobed thallus with shallowly scalloped margins that carry many very short, slender isidia (some appearing as tiny granules). Mason Hale later cited the specimen "Yasuda 210" from Mimasaka Province, Japan as the lectotype. He noted lobes about 1–5 mm wide; a dull, fairly smooth upper surface that is grey to glaucous; and a lower surface whitish to pale, becoming darker towards the centre. The rhizines were described as sparse and short and the extreme margin bare. In spot tests he recorded K on the upper surface negative, the medulla turning strongly yellow and then red with K, and C negative. Vainio compared the new taxon with Parmelia rudecta and P. laceratula, from which he considered it distinct. Veli Räsänen subsequently introduced Parmelia yasudae in 1940 (type: Iyo Province, Japan) and P. psoromoides in 1949 (type: Mt Panai, Benguet, Luzon), both of which Hale placed in synonymy with P. isidioclada. In a later reappraisal, Syo Kurokawa re-examined the type material of Parmelia psoromoides and concluded that it was the same species as P. sectilis, a Philippine taxon described by Mason Hale in 1968. This taxon has dissected, densely isidiate lobes with marginal pseudocyphellae and large spores. He regarded P. psoromoides as the correct name for this species, with P. sectilis in synonymy, and considered this taxon to belong to the Parmelia saxatilis group rather than to P. isidioclada and its allies.

Multilocus phylogenetic analyses revealed that Parmelia isidioclada, despite its isidiate thallus, belongs to the monophyletic East Asian clade of Nipponoparmelia. The study identified consistent morphological markers, particularly minute pseudocyphellae limited to lobe margins and a grey upper surface with atranorin, that distinguish this group from Parmelia in the strict sense. These characters, together with its molecular placement, warranted the new combination Nipponoparmelia isidioclada.

== Description ==
Nipponoparmelia isidioclada forms a foliose (leafy) thallus that is loosely attached to bark or rock and rather firm. It is greenish mineral grey, often turning brownish in the herbarium, and typically 8–12 cm across. The lobes are narrow and mostly parallel-sided (sublinear), 2–4 mm wide, lying close together; their margins are rolled upward. Tiny aeration pores (pseudocyphellae) occur along the lobe edges. These pores soon become granular in texture and give rise to dense, branched, cylindrical to slightly lobulate outgrowths known as coralloid and isidioid projections, which run along the lobe margins. The projections are to about 1 mm tall and their tips crumble with age, producing a mealy surface (subsorediate) that helps the lichen spread vegetatively. The upper surface is plane, shiny and continuous. The lower surface is brown to whitish in a narrow marginal zone but black in the centre, and is densely clothed in rhizines (fine, root-like holdfasts) that are simple to forked and 1–1.5 mm long. Pycnidia were not seen. Apothecia are rare, short-stalked to nearly stalkless and less than 5 mm across; the spore-bearing layer is about 60 μm high, with ascospores 13–16 × 23–30 μm. The major lichen substances are atranorin and salazinic acid (with consalazinic acid also reported).

== Habitat and distribution ==
Nipponoparmelia isidioclada has been recorded from Japan, the Philippines, and China. The species also occurs in the Russian Far East (Jewish Autonomous Oblast, Primorsky Krai) and Taiwan, where it is an epiphyte on conifer and broadleaved bark in conifer–broadleaf, fir–spruce, broadleaf, and larch forests; within Russia it is regarded as rare.
