= Taksimo =

Taksimo Таксимо
- Urban-type settlement
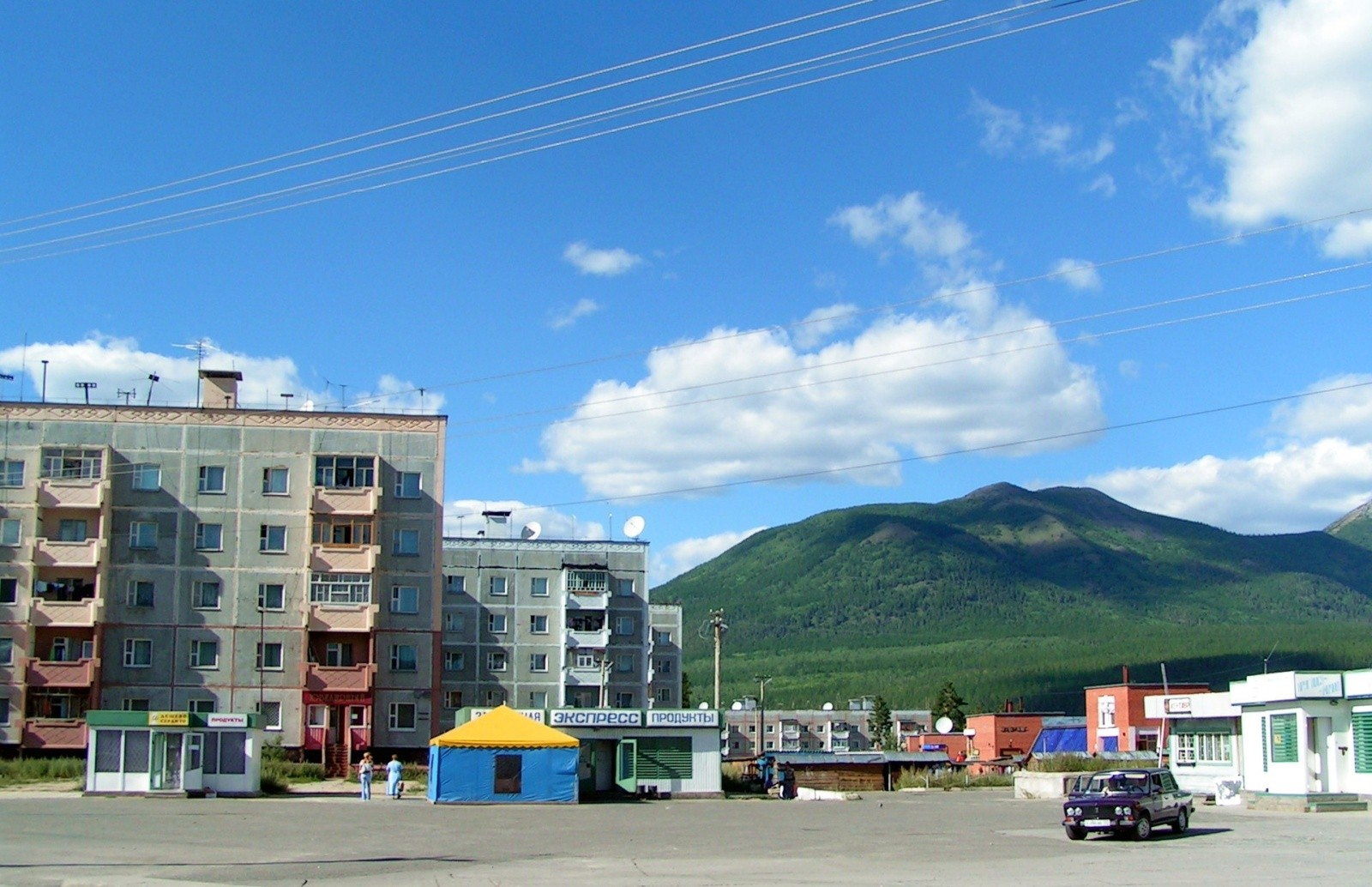
- Taksimo central square
- Interactive map of Taksimo
- Location of Taksimo Taksimo (Republic of Buryatia)
- Coordinates: 56°22′N 114°55′E
- Country: Russia
- Federal subject: Buryatia
- Administrative district: Muysky District
- Urban-type settlementSelsoviet: Taksimo Urban-Type Settlement
- Founded: 1910
- Urban-type settlement status since: 1989
- Elevation: 516 m (1,693 ft)

Population (2010 Census)
  - Total: 9,438
  - Estimate (2025): 7,078 (−25%)

Administrative status
  - Capital of: Muysky District, Taksimo Urban-Type Settlement

Municipal status
  - Municipal district: Muysky Municipal District
  - Urban settlement: Taksimo Urban Settlement
  - Capital of: Muysky Municipal District, Taksimo Urban Settlement
- Time zone: UTC+8 (MSK+5)
- Postal codes: 671560, 671561
- OKTMO ID: 81635151051
- Website: taksimo.org

Taksimo population
- 2010 Census: 9,438
- 2002 Census: 10,552
- 1989 Census: 12,368

Taksimo (Russian: Таксимо́; Buryat and Mongolian: Таксимо, Taksimo) is an urban locality (an urban-type settlement) and the administrative center of Muysky District of the Republic of Buryatia, Russia, located on the Muya River on the Muysk Plateau in the far northeast of the republic. As of the 2010 Census, its population was 9,438.

It lies along the Baikal–Amur Mainline (BAM) railway, with Russia's longest train tunnel, Severomuysky Tunnel, just to the west of the town.

== Etymology ==
Taksimo's name comes from the Evenki language and means cup or bowl, possibly because of its location in a valley in Muysky Mountains.

== History ==
Buryats, who had emigrated from the Chara River area, began settling the region in the 1860s, although a number of Evenks already lived there. Modern Taksimo began as the settlement of exile Ivan Barancheyev, who escaped from the settlement of Kirensk in the Lena mining area during rioting in 1905. He gradually wandered along the Vitim River and eventually settled in the area of present-day Taksimo in 1910. Barancheyev's outpost became a trading point for stagecoaches, although it was not until 1920 that other families moved to the area and founded the actual settlement. By 1934, the population of the Muysk Plateau exceeded 1,500.

With the construction of the BAM, the population grew and Taksimo was granted urban-type settlement status in 1989. With the opening of the Severbaykalsk-Taksimo section, Muysky District was created in 1989 with Taksimo as its administrative center.

== Administrative and municipal status ==
Within the framework of administrative divisions, Taksimo serves as the administrative center of Muysky District. As an administrative division, the urban-type settlement (inhabited locality) of Taksimo is incorporated within Muysky District as Taksimo Urban-Type Settlement (an administrative division of the district). As a municipal division, Taksimo Urban-Type Settlement and Bambuysky Selsoviet are incorporated within Muysky Municipal District as Taksimo Urban Settlement.

== Economy ==
Logging and gold mining are conducted in the area around the settlement. The economic importance of the settlement itself is mainly due to the BAM railway. The settlement is the terminus of the electrified western section. It is also served by the Taksimo Airport.
