= Vitim (river) =

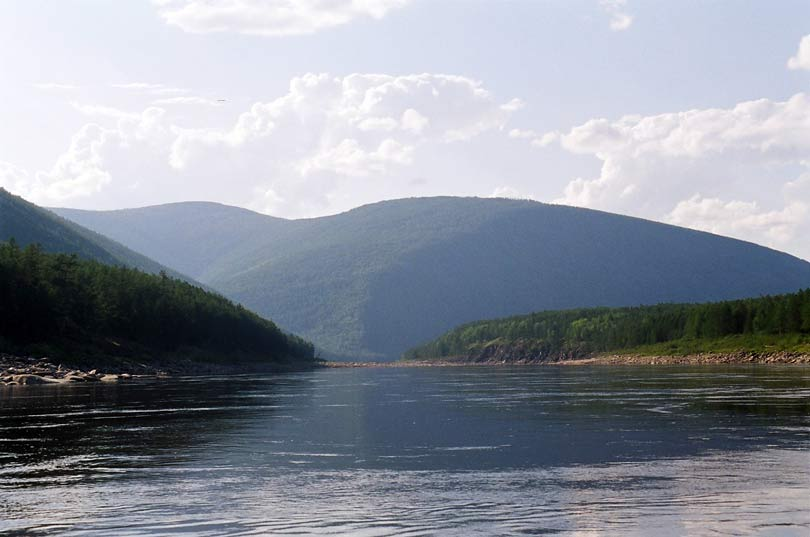
- The Vitim near its tributary Bambuyka

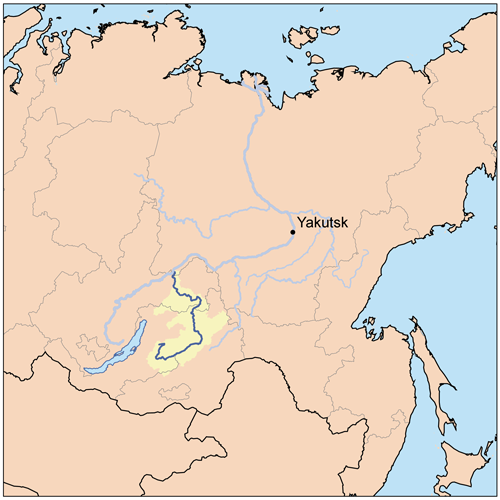
- Location of the Vitim River and watershed
- Native name: Витим (Russian); Витым (Evenki); Witym (Evenki); Виитим (Yakut); Viitim (Yakut); Витим (Buryat); Vitim (Buryat)

Location
- Country: Russia
- Region: Buryatia, Irkutsk Oblast, Sakha Republic, Zabaykalsky Krai
- Cities: Bodaybo, Vitim, Mama, Russia

Physical characteristics
- Source
  - location: Confluence of rivers Vitimkan and China, Ikat Range, Irkutsk Oblast
  - elevation: 1,171 m (3,842 ft)
- Mouth: Lena
  - coordinates: 59.4631°N 112.6013°E
- Length: 1,940 km (1,210 mi)
- Basin size: 225,000 km^{2} (87,000 sq mi)
- Discharge
  - average: 1,937 m^{3}/s (68,400 cu ft/s)

Basin features
- Progression: Lena→ Laptev Sea
- Tributaries
  - left: Tsipa, Muya, Mamakan, Mama
  - right: Konda, Karenga, Kalakan, Kalar, Bodaybo

The Vitim (Russian: Витим; Evenki: Витым, Witym; Yakut: Виитим, Viitim [local pronunciation]; Buryat and Mongolian: Витим, Vitim) is a major tributary of the Lena. Its source is east of Lake Baikal, at the confluence of rivers Vitimkan from the west and China from the east. The Vitim flows first south, bends eastwards and then northward in the Vitim Plateau. Then it flows north through the Stanovoy Highlands and the town of Bodaybo. Including river Vitimkan, its western source, it is 1,978 kilometres (1,229 mi) long, and has a drainage basin of 225,000 square kilometres (87,000 sq mi).

It is navigable from the Lena to Bodaybo. Upstream, tugs can haul barges as far as the Baikal Amur Mainline (BAM), but this is becoming rare.

The Vitim is an excellent place for adventure rafting, but is rarely visited because of its isolation. Baissa, one of the famous localities of fossil insects is situated on the left bank of the Vitim River.

== History ==
The first Russian to explore the river was probably Maksim Perfilyev in 1639–40, who brought back reports of the upper Amur River. Formerly, because of its swift current, goods were hauled 144 kilometres (89 mi) overland from Chita to Romanovka. There boats were built, floated down the river, and broken up at their destination. This lasted until the late 1940s.

=== Vitim impact event ===
The Vitim event occurred in the Vitim River basin near Bodaybo on 25 September 2002. The event is described as to be caused by a bolide. The event was similar to Tagish Lake.

== Course ==
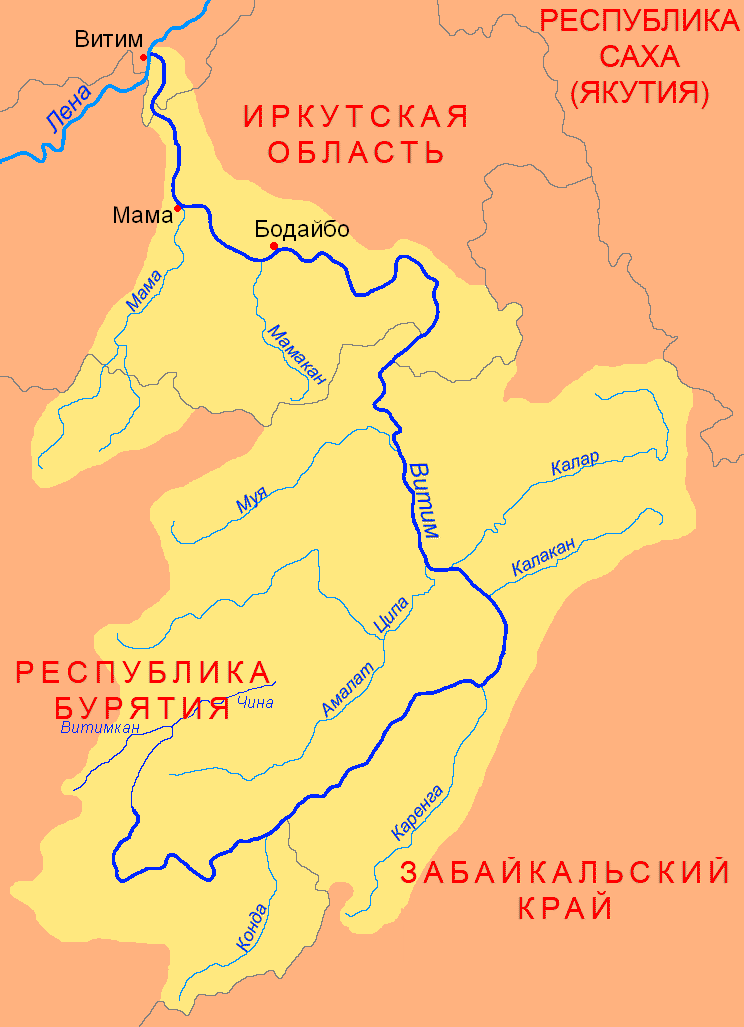
The Vitim and its tributaries (in Russian)

Going upstream: Vitim town where the Vitim joins the Lena. Mama and Mama Airport, about 130 kilometres (81 mi) south of Vitim. A muscovite mica mine from 1705 until the late 1930s. Now a small settlement. Mamakan, on a west-flowing stretch 200 kilometres (120 mi) south-southeast of Vitim. In 1963 a 86MW dam on the Mamakan River was completed, one of the first dams built on permafrost. Bodaybo, just upstream, a gold mining center founded in 1864. Upstream, the port of Luzhki was the start of a road to the Lena gold fields. From here upstream the river goes crookedly east and then south. About 240 kilometres (150 mi) upstream from Bodaybo are the Delyun-Uran Rapids and after 140 kilometres (87 mi) more, the Parama Rapids. About 40 kilometres (25 mi) or so upstream, the Vitim is crossed by the Baikal Amur Mainline between Taksimo and Kuanda. Upriver there are more rapids and goldfields. South through the Stanovoy Mountains toward Chita, then west into the Vitim Plateau east of Lake Baikal. The river peaks in June and freezes from November to May.

=== Tributaries ===
The main tributaries of the Vitim are, from source to mouth:

- Konda (right)
- Karenga (right)
- Kalakan (right)
- Kalar (right)
- Tsipa (left)
- Bambuyka (right)
- Muya (left)
- Kuanda (left)
- Bodaybo (right)
- Mamakan (left)
- Mama (left)

== See also ==
- List of rivers of Russia
- Patom Highlands
- Selenga Highlands
- Southern Muya Range
- Vitimsky HPP Cascade
