= Muysky District =

Muysky District Муйский район (Russian)
- District

Other transcription(s)
  - Buryat: Муяын аймаг
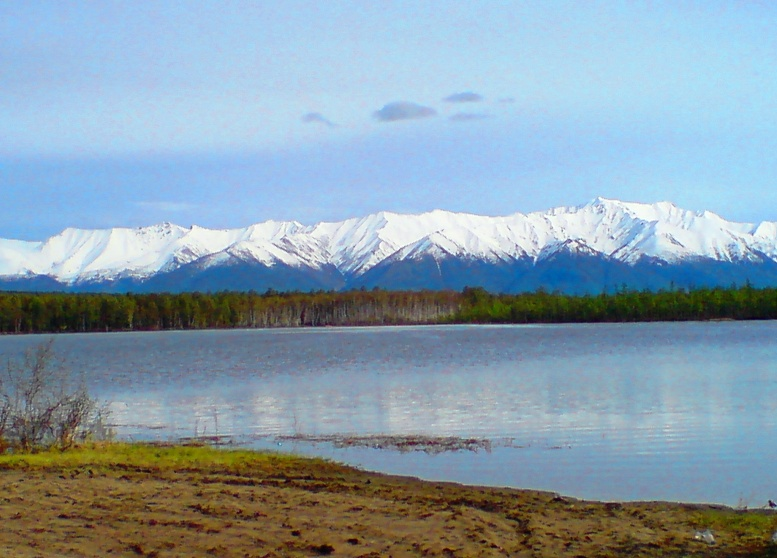
- Mountains in Muysky District

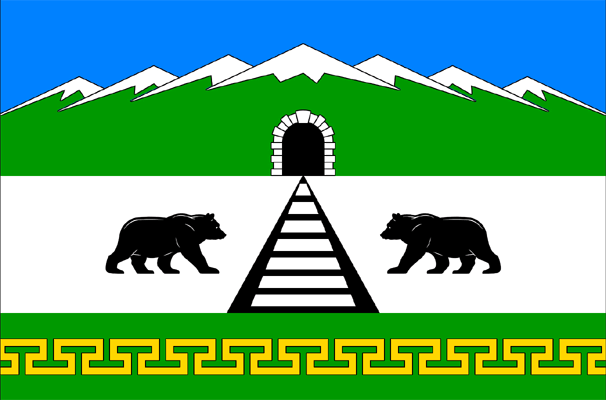
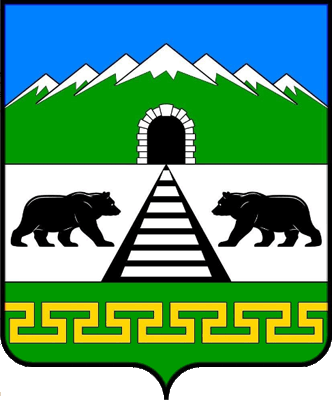
- Flag Coat of arms
- Location of Muysky District in the Buryat Republic
- Coordinates: 56°20′N 114°54′E
- Country: Russia
- Federal subject: Republic of Buryatia
- Established: October 23, 1989
- Administrative center: Taksimo

Area
  - Total: 25,164.1 km^{2} (9,715.9 sq mi)

Population (2010 Census)
  - Total: 13,142
  - Density: 0.52225/km^{2} (1.3526/sq mi)
  - Urban: 88.5%
  - Rural: 11.5%

Administrative structure
  - Administrative divisions: 2 Urban-type settlements, 2 Selsoviets
  - Inhabited localities: 2 urban-type settlements, 6 rural localities

Municipal structure
  - Municipally incorporated as: Muysky Municipal District
  - Municipal divisions: 2 urban settlements, 1 rural settlements
- Time zone: UTC+8 (MSK+5)
- OKTMO ID: 81635000
- Website: http://www.admmsk.ru

Population of Muysky District
- 2010 Census: 13,142
- 2002 Census: 16,641

Muysky District (Russian: Му́йский райо́н; Buryat: Муяын аймаг, Muyayn aimag) is an administrative and municipal district (raion), one of the twenty-one in the Republic of Buryatia, Russia. It is located in the northeast of the republic. The area of the district is 25,164.1 square kilometers (9,715.9 sq mi). Its administrative center is the urban locality (an urban-type settlement) of Taksimo. As of the 2010 Census, the total population of the district was 13,142, with the population of Taksimo accounting for 71.8% of that number.

== History ==
The district was established on October 23, 1989 from parts of the territories of Bauntovsky and Severo-Baykalsky Districts.

== Administrative and municipal status ==
Within the framework of administrative divisions, Muysky District is one of the twenty-one in the Republic of Buryatia. It is divided into two urban-type settlements (administrative divisions with the administrative centers, correspondingly, in the urban-type settlements (inhabited localities) of Severomuysk and Taksimo) and two selsoviets, which comprise six rural localities. As a municipal division, the district is incorporated as Muysky Municipal District. Severomuysk Urban-Type Settlement is incorporated as an urban settlement within the municipal district. The other urban settlement within the municipal district incorporates two administrative divisions—Taksimo Urban-Type Settlement and Bambuysky Selsoviet. The remaining selsoviet is incorporated as a rural settlement within the municipal district. The urban-type settlement of Taksimo serves as the administrative center of both the administrative and municipal district.
