= Balakhninsky (urban-type settlement) =

Balakhninsky Балахнинский
- Urban-type settlement
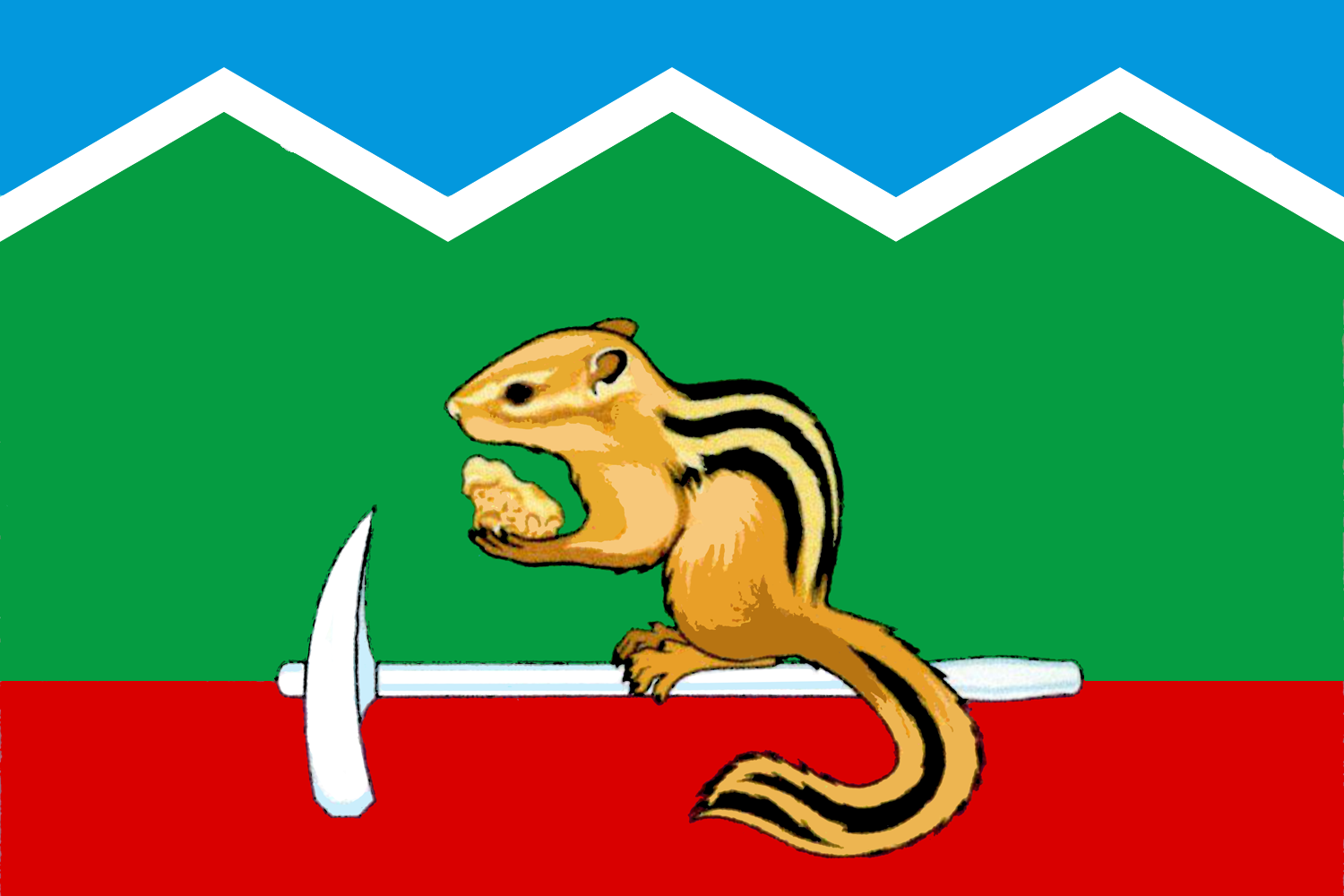
- Flag
- Interactive map of Balakhninsky
- Location of Balakhninsky Balakhninsky (Irkutsk Oblast)
- Coordinates: 58.0091°N 114.2822°E
- Country: Russia
- Federal subject: Irkutsk Oblast
- Administrative district: Bodaybinsky District
- Founded: 1976
- Elevation: 373 m (1,224 ft)

Population (2010 Census)
  - Total: 1,300
  - Estimate (2025): 841 (−35.3%)

Administrative status
  - Capital of: Balakhninsky Urban Settlement
- Time zone: UTC+8 (MSK+5)
- Postal code: 666921
- OKTMO ID: 25602156051

Balakhninsky (Russian: Балахнинский) is an urban locality (an urban-type settlement) in Bodaybinsky District of Irkutsk Oblast, Russia. Population: 1,300 (2010 census); 1,720 (2002 census); 2,124 (1989 Soviet census).

== Administrative status ==
Balakhninsky is the capital of the Balakhninsky Urban Settlement (Балахнинское городское поселение) municipal unit, which includes the Balakhninsky urban locality, as well as the villages of Kyakhtinsky and Vasilievsky.

== Geography ==
The locality is located in the Patom Highlands by the Bodaybo, a tributary of the Vitim, and its confluence with the Balakhna River, 18 km (11 mi) north of Bodaybo city. The 25N-092 highway. passes through the village, connecting it with the city of Bodaibo to the north, as well as with the settlements of Artyomovskiy, Kropotkin and Perevoz. The nearest airfield is Bodaybo Airport.
