= Patom =

Patom may refer to:

- Patom Highlands, in East Siberia
- Patom crater
- Big Patom River
- Bolshoy Patom (village)
- Patom Theory
