= Kropotkin Range =

Mountain range in Siberia

Kropotkin Range Хребет Кропоткина
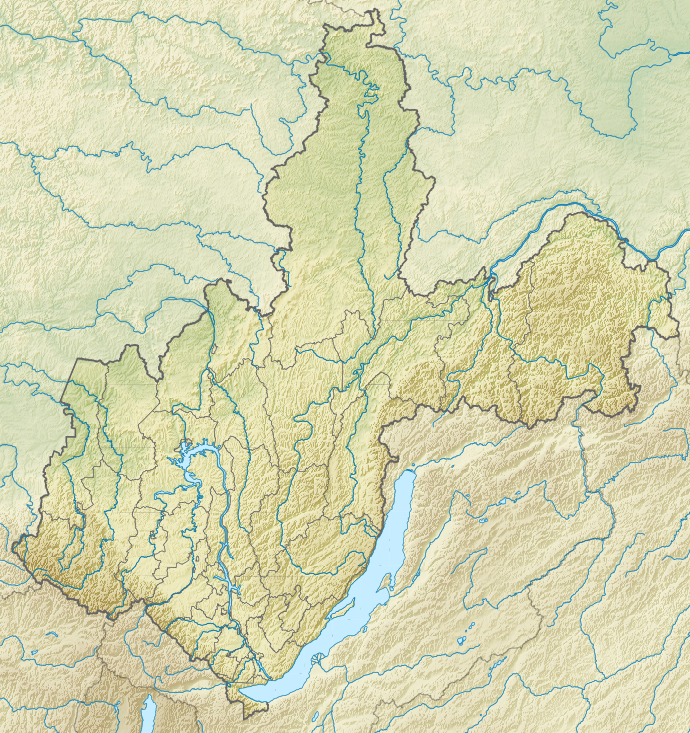
- Location within Irkutsk Oblast

Highest point
- Peak: Golets Korolenko
- Elevation: 1,647 m (5,404 ft)
- Coordinates: 57°50′48″N 115°58′21″E

Dimensions
- Length: 150 km (93 mi) SE / NW
- Width: 40 km (25 mi)

Geography
- Country: Russia
- Federal subject: Irkutsk Oblast
- Range coordinates: 58°0′N 115°0′E
- Parent range: Patom Highlands; South Siberian System

Geology
- Orogeny: Alpine orogeny
- Rock age(s): Proterozoic, Precambrian
- Rock type(s): Crystalline schists, metamorphic rocks

Climbing
- Easiest route: From Bodaybo Airport

Kropotkin Range (Russian: Хребет Кропоткина) is a mountain range in Bodaybinsky District, Irkutsk Oblast, Russian Federation. The settlements of Kropotkin and Artyomovsky are located in the area of the range.

== History ==
In the course of the 1901 exploration of the Lena Goldfields led by Vladimir Obruchev, the area was first explored, studied, topographically photographed and mapped by Russian geologist and topographer Pavel Preobrazhensky. He named the mountain range in honor of Peter Kropotkin in 1902.

== Geography ==
The Kropotkin Range rises to the north of Bodaybo, stretching roughly for about 150 kilometres (93 mi) in a NW to SE direction from the southern part of the Patom Highlands, roughly parallel to the course of the Vitim River to the southwest and west.

The slopes of the Kropotkin Range are dissected by wide river valleys. The range summits are generally rounded and of moderate height. The highest peak is 1,647 metres (5,404 ft) high Golets Korolenko, a ‘’golets’’-type of mountain with a bald peak.

=== Hydrography ===
The Zhuya river, a left tributary of the Chara, has its sources in the eastern slopes and limits the range in its southeastern section. From the southern slopes originate a few right tributaries of the Vitim, all of them small and short, such as the Takhtiga. In the northern slopes are the sources of some left tributaries of the upper course of the Bolshoy Patom, such as the Anangra and Mara.

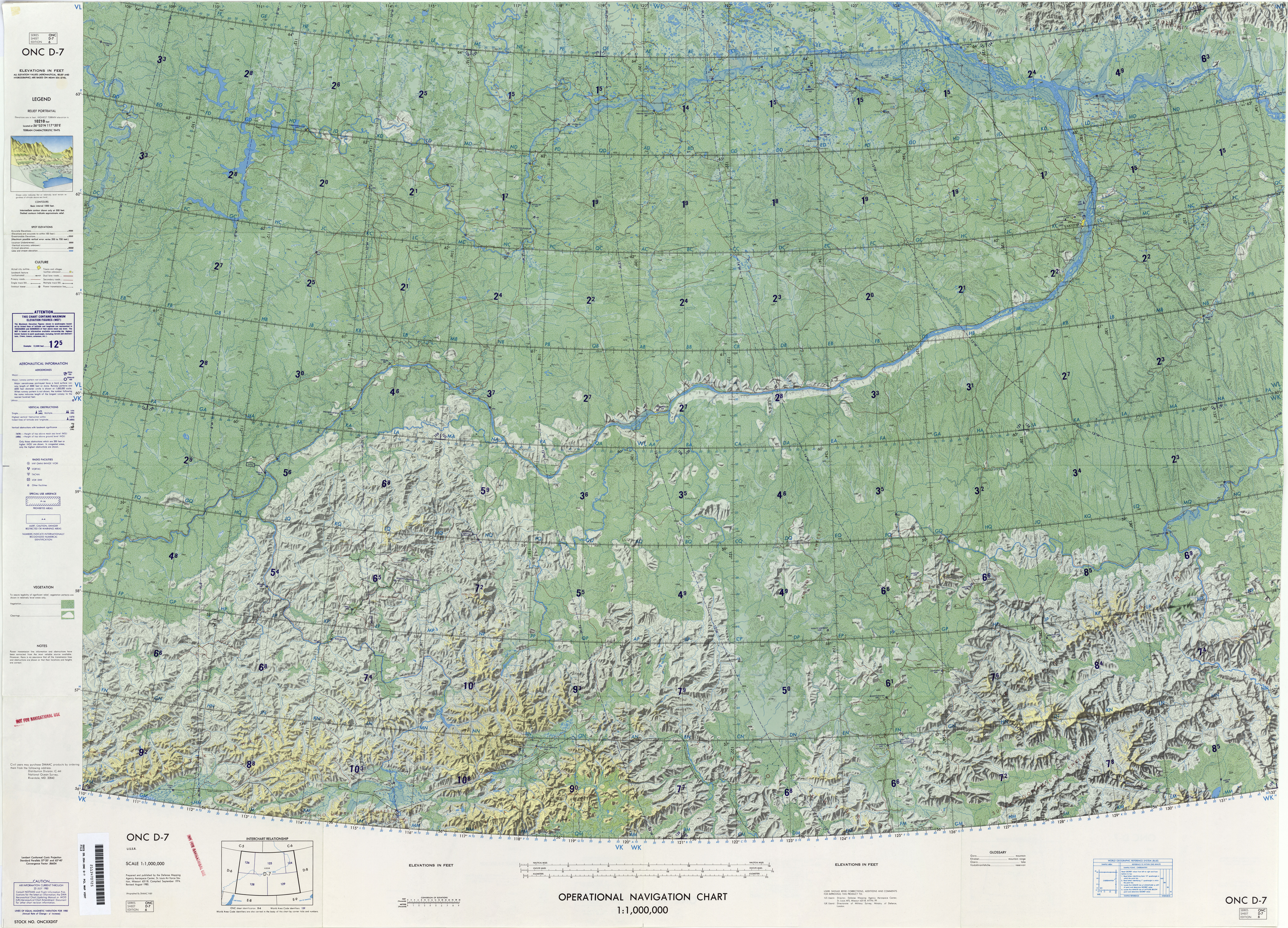
Defense Mapping Agency map showing the Kropotkin Range area in the lower left part.

== Flora ==
The lower slopes of the range are mainly covered by pine and larch taiga, with mountain tundra and band thickets of dwarf cedar at higher elevations.

== See also ==
- List of mountains and hills of Russia
