= Bodaybinsky =

Bodaybinsky (masculine), Bodaybinskaya (feminine), or Bodaybinskoye (neuter) may refer to:

- Bodaybinsky District, a district of Irkutsk Oblast, Russia
- Bodaybinskoye Urban Settlement, a municipal formation which the town of Bodaybo and the selo of Nerpo in Bodaybinsky District of Irkutsk Oblast, Russia are incorporated as
