= Bodaybo (disambiguation) =

Bodaybo is a town in Irkutsk Oblast, Russia.

Bodaybo may also refer to:

- Bodaybo (river), a river in Irkutsk Oblast, Russia, on which the town of Bodaybo stands
- Bodaybo District
- Bodaybo Airport (IATA: ODO, ICAO: UIKB), a regional airport in Irkutsk Oblast, Russia
