= Kyakhtinsky, Irkutsk Oblast =

Kyakhtinsky Кяхтинский
- Village
- Location within Irkutsk Oblast Location within Russia
- Coordinates: 57°56′N 114°14′E
- Country: Russia
- Region: Irkutsk Oblast
- District: Bodaybinsky District
- Time zone: UTC+8:00

Kyakhtinsky (Russian: Кяхтинский) is a rural locality (a settlement) in Bodaybinsky District, Irkutsk Oblast, Russia. Population: 24 (2010 census);

== Geography ==
This rural locality is located 11 kilometres (6.8 mi) from Bodaybo (the district's administrative centre), 861 kilometres (535 mi) from Irkutsk (capital of Irkutsk Oblast) and 4,529 kilometres (2,814 mi) from Moscow. Balakhninsky is the nearest rural locality.
