= Balakhninsky =

Balakhninsky (masculine), Balakhninskaya (feminine), or Balakhninskoye (neuter) may refer to:

- Balakhninsky District of Nizhny Novgorod Oblast, Russia
- Balakhninsky (urban-type settlement), an urban-type settlement in Irkutsk Oblast, Russia
