= Marakan, Irkutsk Oblast =

Marakan Маракан
- Village
- Location within Irkutsk Oblast Location within Russia
- Coordinates: 58°42′N 114°34′E
- Country: Russia
- Region: Irkutsk Oblast
- District: Bodaybinsky District
- Time zone: UTC+8:00

Marakan (Russian: Маракан) is a rural locality (a settlement) in Bodaybinsky District, Irkutsk Oblast, Russia. Population: 389 (2010 census);

== Geography ==
This rural locality is located 97 kilometres (60 mi) from Bodaybo (the district's administrative centre), 929 kilometres (577 mi) from Irkutsk (capital of Irkutsk Oblast) and 4,458 kilometres (2,770 mi) from Moscow.
