= Lena Gold Mining Partnership =

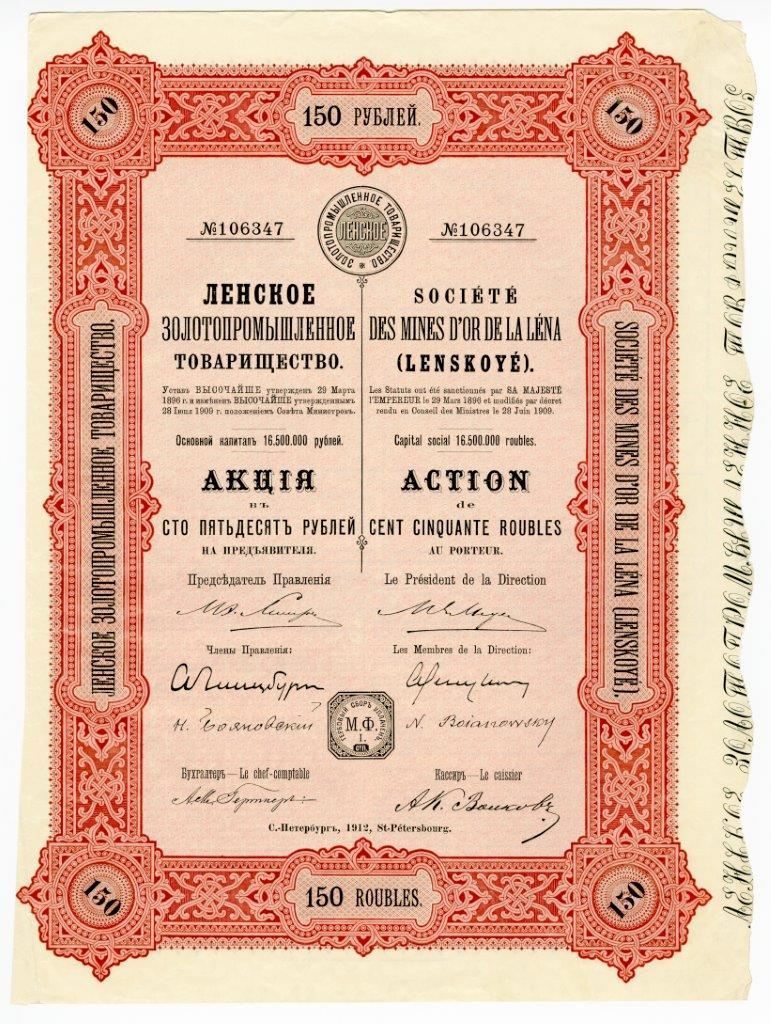
One bearer share par value of 150 roubles of The Lena Gold Mining Partnership. St. Petersburg, 1912

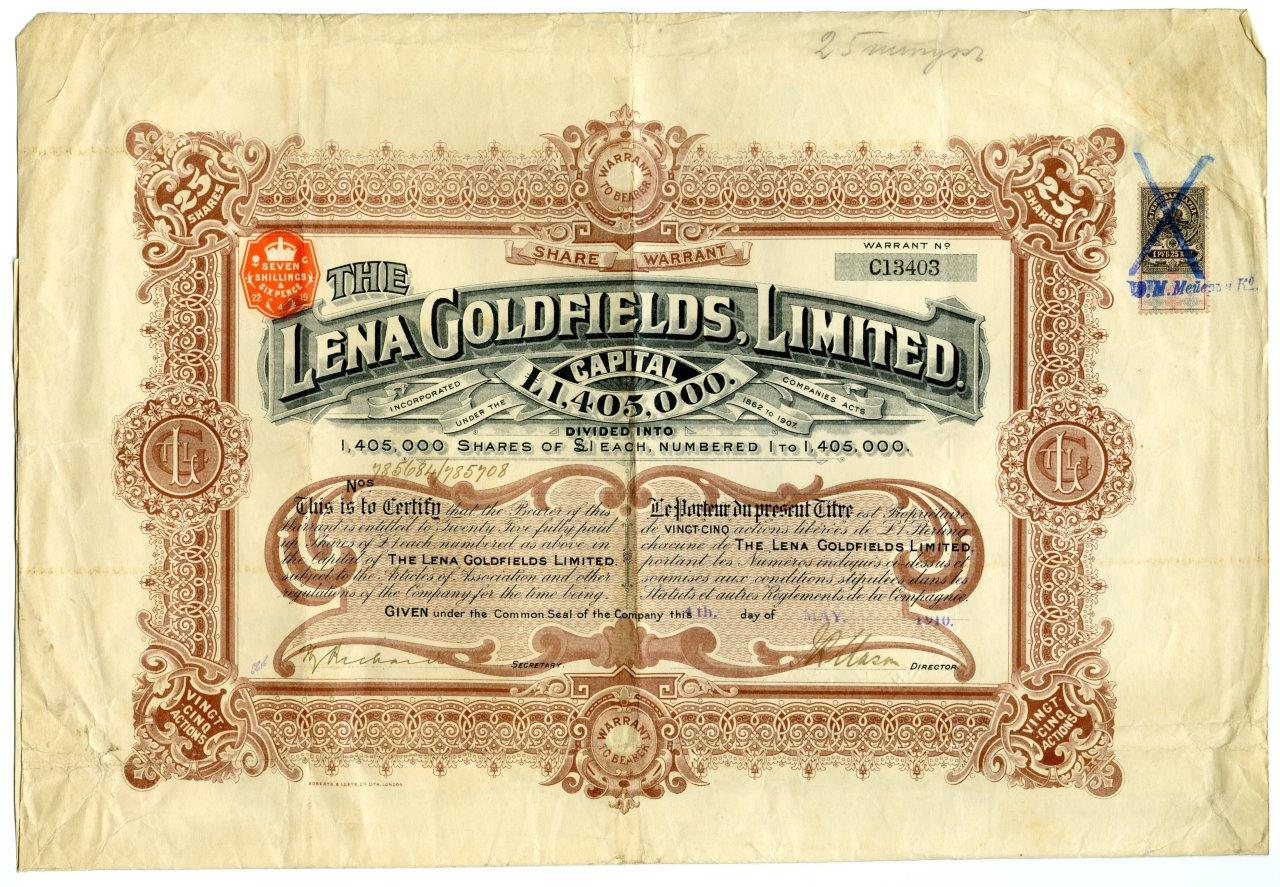
Share warrant The Lena Goldfields, Limited. 1910

In 1855, two merchants, Pavel Basnin and Petr Katyshevtsev, members of the top guild and honorary citizens of Irkutsk, founded the Lena Gold Mining Partnership. By the beginning of the 1870s, Evzel Gintsburg and the Meyer & Co trading house had begun accumulating shares of the mining partnership. In 1882, the Gintsburg dynasty – headed by father Evzel (Osip) Gabrielovich Gintsburg (1812–1878) and his son Horace (1833–1909) – started to dominate the gold trade in the Lena River region.

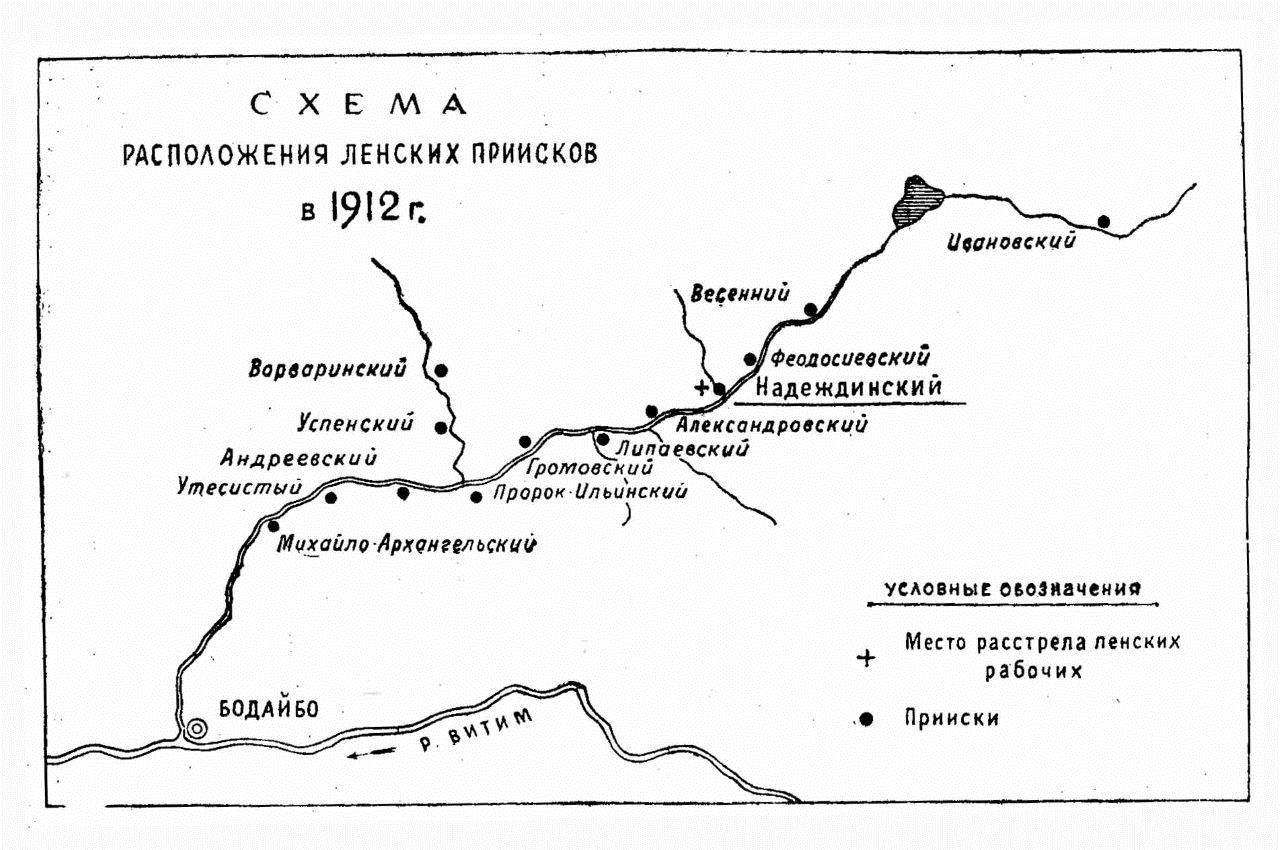
Layout of the Lena's Goldfields., Ltd. mines. 1912

== History ==
The Gintsburgs and the State Bank were respectively the company's largest and second-largest shareholders. The other shareholders were the Tsar's ministers Witte, Timashev and Timiryazev, and even Empress Maria Fedorovna. With such an influential team of owners, obtaining credit from the state was not a complicated undertaking; thus, the Lena partnership developed rapidly.

=== Seizures ===
Still not satisfied, however, the Gintsburgs began a massive seizure of neighbouring territories. The company willingly engaged in legal battles, first with the individual owners of the gold mines and then with the companies themselves. Even though gold mining is an inherently risky business, Horace Gintsburg retained gold mines for many years "just in case", hoping one day to uncover hidden wealth and precious surprises".

Thereafter, the Lena partnership's search for capital followed a dual pathway. After 1896, the partnership was reorganized as a joint-stock company with nominal capital of 4.5 million gold rubles. A year later, additional shares amounting to 1.5 million gold rubles were issued; but the gold mines required still more millions, prompting Gintsburg to pursue a larger credit facility on the Russian financial market.

The free trading of gold was prohibited, leaving the Russian State Bank as the sole exclusive purchaser of gold. While the Tsar's government had always shown great interest in accumulating gold, its enthusiasm for mining the metal especially increased in the 1890s due to financial reforms implemented by Russian finance minister S.Y. Witte and the introduction of the gold currency. After 1902, owing to the connections of Gintsburg, the Lena partnership found itself in a unique position. The State Bank extended it an unlimited long-term line of credit amounting to 6–7 million rubles. One of the bank's directors N.I. Boyanovskiy was included in the partnership's board of directors to exert a measure of financial control, and I.N. Belozerov, a protege of the State Bank, was appointed as chief manager of the mines. In supplying the Lena partnership with money, the bank was interested not so much in earning a profit as in solidifying the gold-mining industry as a foundation of the state financial system. Gintsburg and the other shareholders, on the contrary, were keen to capitalize on profit and to receive the maximum possible dividends; therefore, a decision was made whereby the partnership had to become independent from the bank and search for a more cooperative lender.

In 1907–1908, such a lender was easily found in London, where a group of English financiers headed by Lord Harris, a participant in gold mining enterprises in America and Africa, had become interested in Russian gold. A special joint-stock company, Lena Goldfields, was formed with nominal capital of 1,405,000 pounds sterling. The English financiers considered Lena Goldfields to be an instrument for speculating in the financial market, a philosophy that soon yielded results. Lena's shares began being quoted on the St. Petersburg exchange in 1905, however it was not until 1908 that they exceeded their nominal value. From the moment they passed into English hands, the Lena shares "had a dazzling career". In 1909, their value increased to 1,850 rubles, reaching in 1910 a colossal value of 6,075 rubles! The fabulous and unprecedented growth of Lena shares was achieved using a comprehensive system of stock exchange manipulation, including payoffs to both the yellow and mainstream press, stockbrokers, questionable banks, and so on.

=== Strike and massacre ===
However, news of a strike at the mines and the ensuing tragic Lena massacre soon spread through the stock exchange and would have a dramatic negative impact on the company's fortunes.

On 4 (17) April 1912, more than two thousand Lena Goldfields employees staged a demonstration. Initially, the demonstration was peaceful, but the leader of the gendarme cavalry Captain Treshenkov ordered his soldiers to open fire on the workers. Two hundred seventy people were killed and 250 were wounded.

=== Nationalization ===
In the aftermath of the massacre, Lena shares fell dramatically, creating a decisive moment in the company's history. In the summer of 1914, the company began discussions about acquiring new equipment and dredges, the first of which was not ordered until 1917. Its manufacture, shipping from the United States, assembly and installation should have taken one and a half or two years, but, at the time of October Revolution, the dredge was only in the process of shipping. On 28 June 1918, the Council of People's Commissars issued a decree on the nationalization of a number of enterprises, among which was Lena Goldfields.

== See also ==
- Lena massacre
- Patom Highlands
