= Patomskiy crater =

Geologic feature in southeastern Russia

- Patom crater Kolpakov Cone
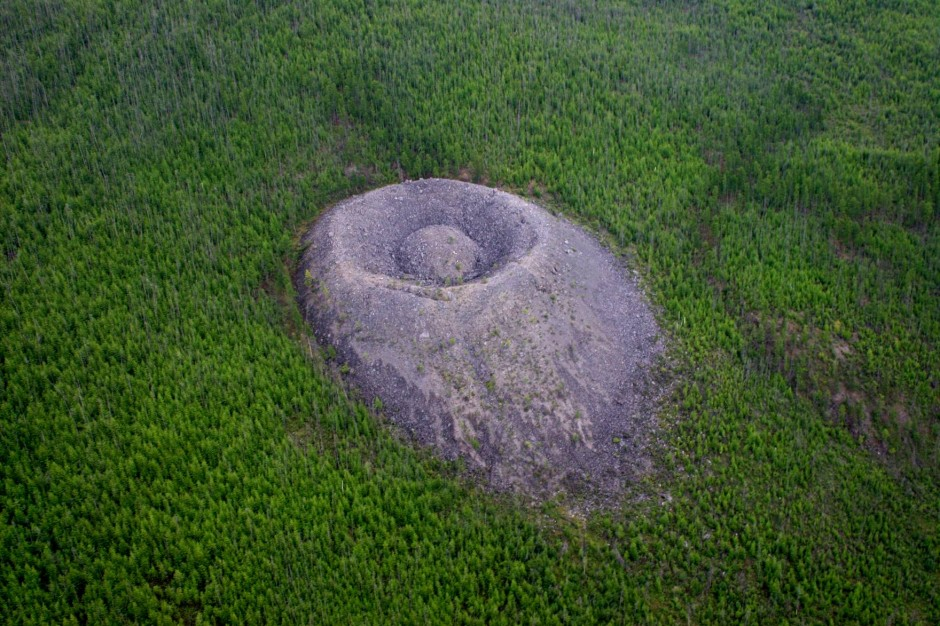
- View of the Patom Crater from a helicopter (2014)

Highest point
- Elevation: 40 m (130 ft)
- Coordinates: 59.284855°N 116.589332°E

Geography
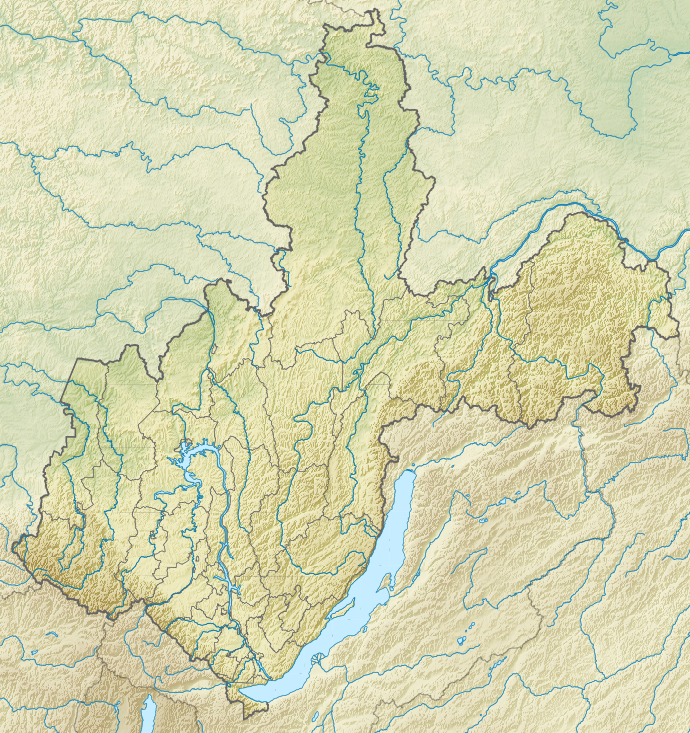
- Location within Irkutsk Oblast
- Location: Patom Highlands; Irkutsk Oblast, Russia

The Patomskiy crater or Patom crater (Russian: Патомский кратер, Patomskiy Krater), also known as Конус Колпакова, Konus Kolpakova "Kolpakov cone") is a peculiar rock formation located in the Bodaibo District of the Irkutsk region of southeastern Siberia, 360 kilometres (220 mi) from the district center Bodaibo. It is a large mound made of shattered limestone blocks on the slopes of the Patom Highlands in an area of dense taiga. Its base diameter is about 160 metres (520 ft) and its height about 40 metres (130 ft); the cone's crown is ring-shaped, and in its center there is a smaller mound with a height of about 12 metres (39 ft). The volume of the crater is estimated as 230,000–250,000 cubic metres (8.1–8.8 million cubic feet), with a weight of about one million tons.

The Patomskiy crater was described by Russian geologist Vadim Kolpakov in 1949, though it was known to the local population before this. Its origins have been subject of intense scientific interest, with hypotheses including meteorite, volcanic and gaseous origin, but to date no definite proof has been given. Through dendrochronology, the age of the crater is estimated to be 300 years.

== Theories of origin ==
Until recently, some scientists believed that the crater presents a large footprint of an ultra-dense meteorite, which had sunk underground upon impact. Another hypothesis was that it is a fragment of the Tunguska meteorite. Others believed that the crater is a result of a breakthrough of a deep pocket of natural gas. Several scientific expeditions have been sent to the crater but the nature of its origin remains a mystery. A study conducted by V. S. Antipin and A. M. Fedorov showed, through morphological, structural and chemical data, that the crater is volcanic in origin. The presence of weathered breccias, the diameter/height ratio typical of volcanic cones, the absence of geochemical anomalies linked to cosmogenic origins, and its zoning of different ages, clearly contradict the meteorite hypothesis. The origin of the cone is therefore thought to be extrusive, caused by a rapid outbreak of deep fluids (CO_{2} and H_{2}O) and gases (CO and H_{2}).

=== Patom Crater Conference, 2010 ===
In 2010, Saint Petersburg Mining Institute held a scientific conference "Patom Crater 2010". Viktor Sergeyevich Antipin, head of a department at the St. Petersburg Institute of Geochemistry of the Russian Academy of Sciences (IG SB RAS), stated that "Since the 2006 expedition by the Institute of Geochemistry (IGC), RAS came to the conclusion that the Patomskiy crater probably originates from geological processes. An important fact is that no serious argument or evidence of a meteorite crater nature referred to by specialists had been given. There was not any new evidence to support the meteorite hypothesis." Antipin further noted that at the conference, for the first time, all the experts rejected the meteoric hypothesis. "Now it has only historical interest," he added.

According to studies by Siberian scientists, the crater formed only 300 to 350 years ago. The zoning of the crater was caused by geological processes and intensive introduction of deep gas flows of matter, which led to the transformation of silicate rocks within the crater. "An important confirmation of these ideas were the result of geophysics from Saint Petersburg Mining University and Yekaterinburg [Institute of Geophysics, UB RAS]. Performing gravimetric and geoelectrical investigations, they also came to the firm conviction that Patom crater has an origin of an endogenetic nature," said Antipin. According to geophysicists of St. Petersburg and Yekaterinburg, meteorite impact craters have a very different shape, and Patom crater is not one of them, he added.

== See also ==
- Lake Baikal
- Ed Stafford: Into The Unknown (Episode 2 - Siberia)
