= Artyomovsky, Irkutsk Oblast =

Artyomovsky Артёмовский
- Work settlement
- Interactive map of Artyomovsky
- Location of Artyomovsky Artyomovsky (Irkutsk Oblast)
- Coordinates: 58°12′29″N 114°38′19″E
- Country: Russia
- Federal subject: Irkutsk Oblast
- Administrative district: Bodaybinsky District
- Founded: 1879

Population (2010 Census)
  - Total: 1,539
  - Estimate (2025): 843 (−45.2%)

Municipal status
  - Municipal district: Bodaybinsky Municipal District
  - Urban settlement: Artyomovskoye Urban Settlement
  - Capital of: Artyomovskoye Urban Settlement
- Time zone: UTC+8 (MSK+5)
- Postal code: 666925
- OKTMO ID: 25602155051

Artyomovsky (Russian: Артёмовский) is an urban locality (urban-type settlement) in Bodaybinsky District of Irkutsk Oblast, Russia. Population: 1,539 (2010 census); 2,186 (2002 census); 3,773 (1989 Soviet census).

== Administrative status ==
As a municipal division, Artyomovsky is the capital of the Artyomovsky Urban Settlement (Артёмовское городское поселение) municipal unit, which includes the Kropotkin urban locality, as well as the villages of Aprilsk and Marakan.

== Geography ==
The locality is located in the Patom Highlands by the Bodaybo, a tributary of the Vitim, 65 km (40 mi) northeast of the town of Bodaybo. The Kropotkin Range rises near the settlement.

== See also ==
- Patom Highlands
