= Kropotkin, Irkutsk Oblast =

Kropotkin Кропоткин
- Work settlement
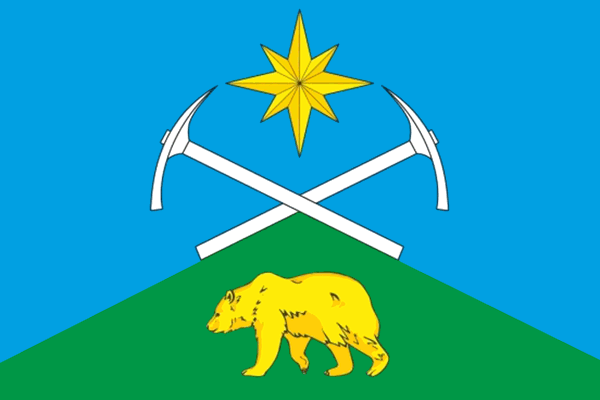
- Flag
- Interactive map of Kropotkin
- Location of Kropotkin Kropotkin (Irkutsk Oblast)
- Coordinates: 58.5042°N 115.3022°E
- Country: Russia
- Federal subject: Irkutsk Oblast
- Administrative district: Bodaybinsky District

Population (2010 Census)
  - Total: 1,335
  - Estimate (2025): 945 (−29.2%)

Administrative status
  - Capital of: Kropotkin Urban Settlement
- Time zone: UTC+8 (MSK+5)
- Postal code: 666940
- OKTMO ID: 25602158051

Kropotkin (Russian: Кропоткин) is an urban locality (a work settlement) in Bodaybinsky District of Irkutsk Oblast, Russia. Population: 1,335 (2010 census); 1,812 (2002 census); 2,770 (1989 Soviet census).

It was named Kropotkin (in honor of Peter Kropotkin) in 1930.

== Administrative status ==
Kropotkin is the capital of the Kropotkin Urban Settlement (Кропоткинского муниципального образования) municipal unit, which includes the Kropotkin urban locality, as well as the village of Svetly.

== Geography ==
It is located on the Patom Highlands, in the Kropotkin Range area, 150 km (93 mi) southwest of Perevoz and 135 km (84 mi) northeast of the regional center, Bodaibo. The town lies on the Nygri River, a left tributary of the Vachi River, a tributary of the Zhuya of the Chara River basin.
