= Nerpo =

Nerpo Нерпо
- Village
- Location within Irkutsk Oblast Location within Russia
- Coordinates: 57°28′N 115°18′E
- Country: Russia
- Region: Irkutsk Oblast
- District: Bodaybinsky District
- Time zone: UTC+8:00

Nerpo (Russian: Нерпо) is a rural locality (a selo) in Bodaybinsky District, Irkutsk Oblast, Russia. Population: 18 (2010 census);

== Geography ==
This rural locality is located 79 kilometres (49 mi) from Bodaybo (the district's administrative centre), 877 kilometres (545 mi) from Irkutsk (capital of Irkutsk Oblast) and 4,649 kilometres (2,889 mi) from Moscow.
