= Svetly, Bodaybinsky District =

Svetly Светлый
- Village
- Location within Irkutsk Oblast Location within Russia
- Coordinates: 58°26′N 115°57′E
- Country: Russia
- Region: Irkutsk Oblast
- District: Bodaybinsky District
- Time zone: UTC+8:00

Svetly (Russian: Светлый) is a rural locality (a settlement) in Bodaybinsky District, Irkutsk Oblast, Russia. Population: 41 (2010 census);

== Geography ==
This rural locality is located 122 kilometres (76 mi) from Bodaybo (the district's administrative centre), 964 kilometres (599 mi) from Irkutsk (capital of Irkutsk Oblast) and 4,570 kilometres (2,840 mi) from Moscow. Kropotkin is the nearest rural locality.
