= Aprelsk =

Human settlement in Bodaybinsky District, Russia

Coordinates: 58.1853°N 114.5825°E

Aprelsk (Russian: Апрельск) is a posyolok (rural settlement; formerly urban-type settlement) in Bodaybinsky District, Irkutsk Oblast, Russia included in Artyomovsky municipality (ru:Артёмовское муниципальное образование).

Established as Nadezhdinsky Mine settlement (Надеждинский прииск) of gold mining in Russian Empire. In 1924 renamed to Апрельский прииск in memory of Lena massacre, April 4, 1912, happened at this place.
