= Perevoz, Bodaybinsky District =

Perevoz Перевоз
- Settlement
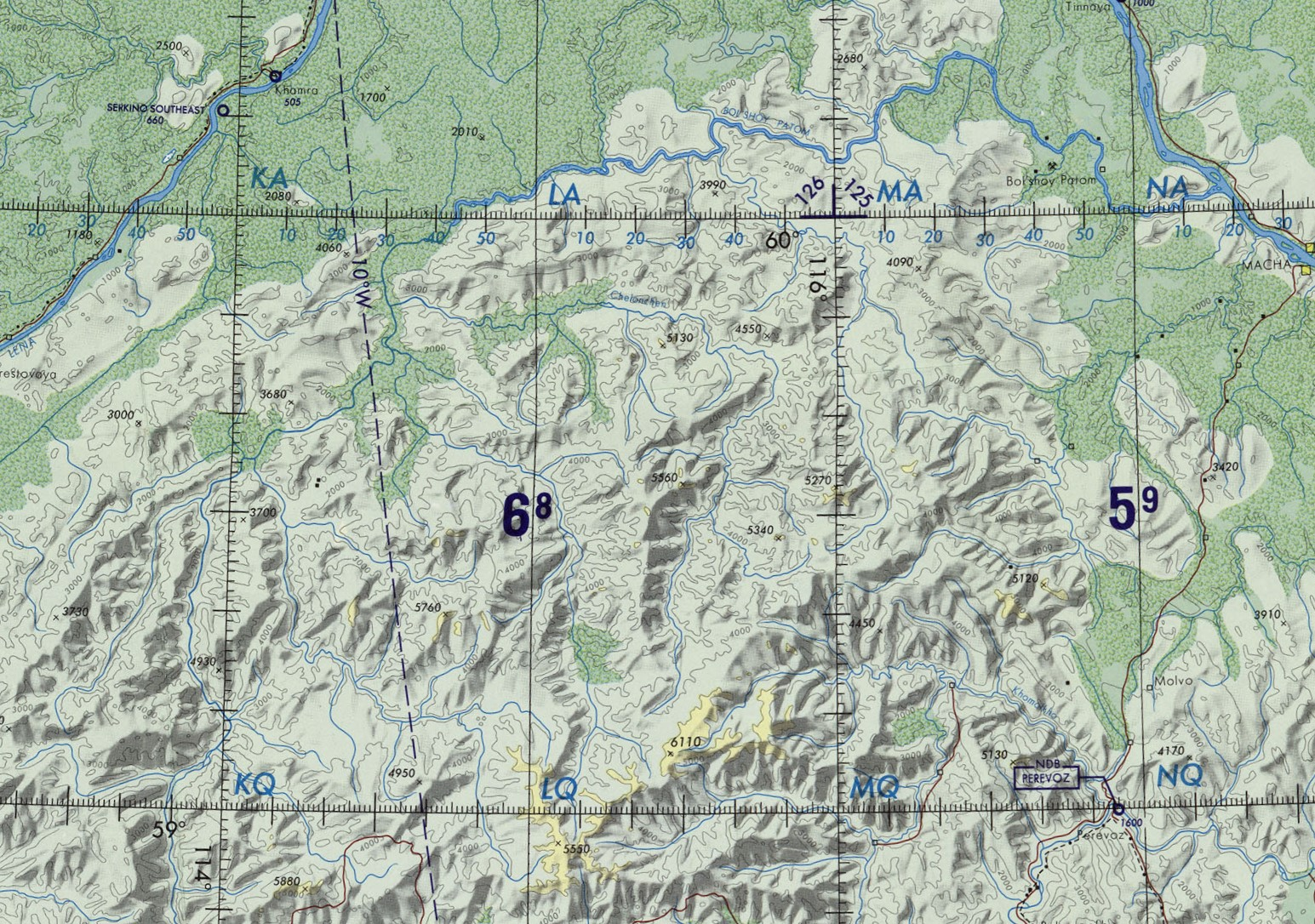
- Bolshoy Patom river course map section. Perevoz in the lower right

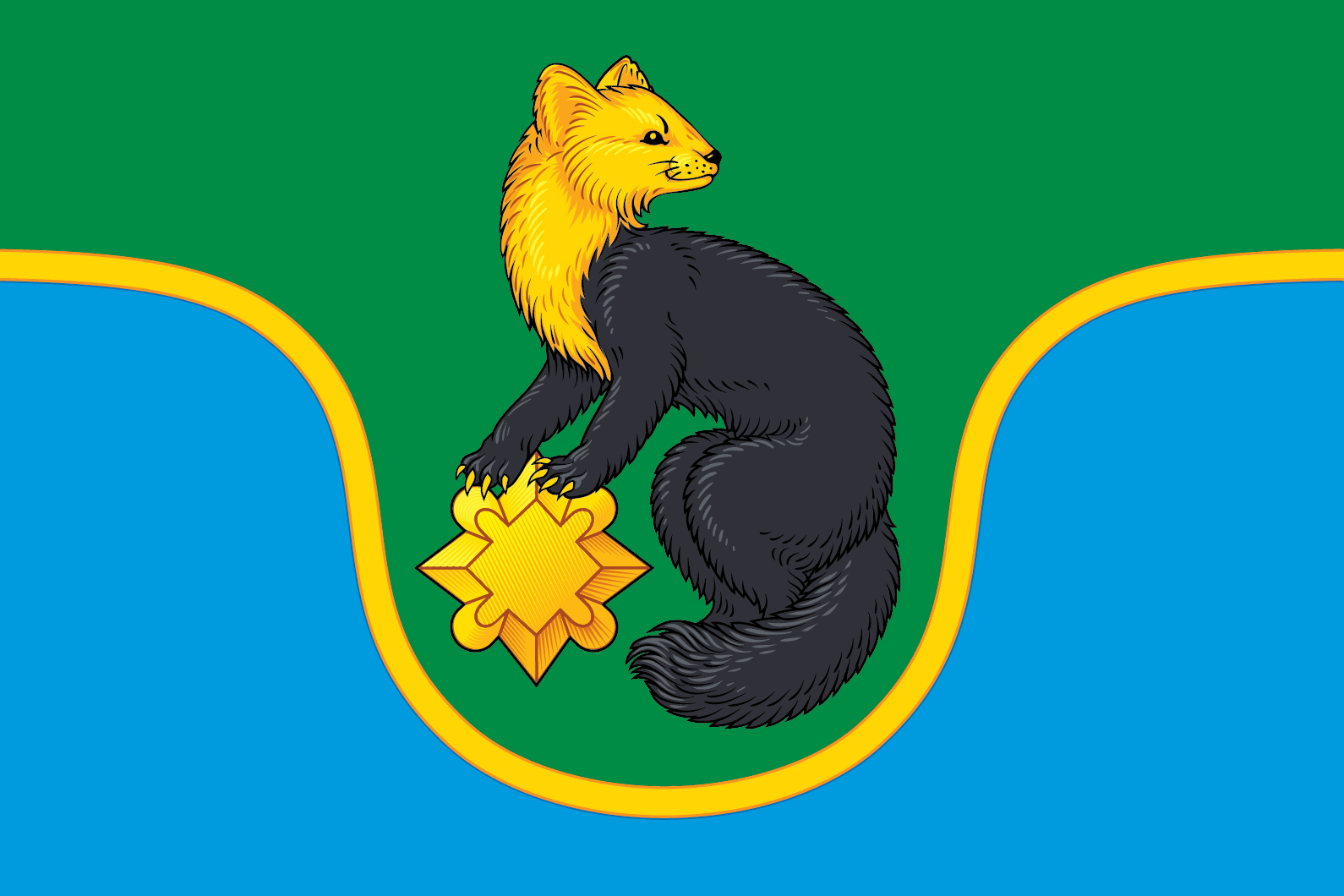
- Flag
- Interactive map of Perevoz
- Location of Perevoz Perevoz (Irkutsk Oblast)
- Coordinates: 59°00′01″N 116°56′16″E
- Country: Russia
- Federal subject: Irkutsk Oblast
- Administrative district: Bodaybinsky District

Population (2010 Census)
  - Total: 869
  - Estimate (2012): 842 (−3.1%)

Administrative status
  - Capital of: Zhuinsky Rural Settlement
- Time zone: UTC+8 (MSK+5)
- Postal code: 666960
- OKTMO ID: 25602402101

Perevoz (Russian: Перевоз) is a rural locality (a "Posyolok", settlement) in Bodaybinsky District of Irkutsk Oblast, Russia. Population: 869 (2010 census); 1,311 (2002 census);

== Administrative status ==
Perevoz is the capital of the Zhuinsky Rural Settlement (Жуинское сельское поселение) municipal unit, which includes the Perevoz rural locality and the Bolshoy Patom village to the north.

== Geography ==
The locality is located in the Patom Highlands by the Zhuya, a tributary of the Chara, 150 km (93 mi) northeast of the working village of Kropotkin. The Khomolkho, one of the Zhuya's main tributaries, flows into the Zhuya opposite the settlement.

== History ==
Perevoz is located in an area traditionally inhabited by Evenks. In 1632, a Russian detachment led by then Yenisei Governor Peter Beketov came to the place where the village now stands.

Following the discovery of gold in 1846, the settlement of Perevoz began to develop steadily. Currently, despite a slight decrease in population since the turn of the century, the town has most modern amenities and is located at the head of the 25N-092 highway.
