= Zhuya =

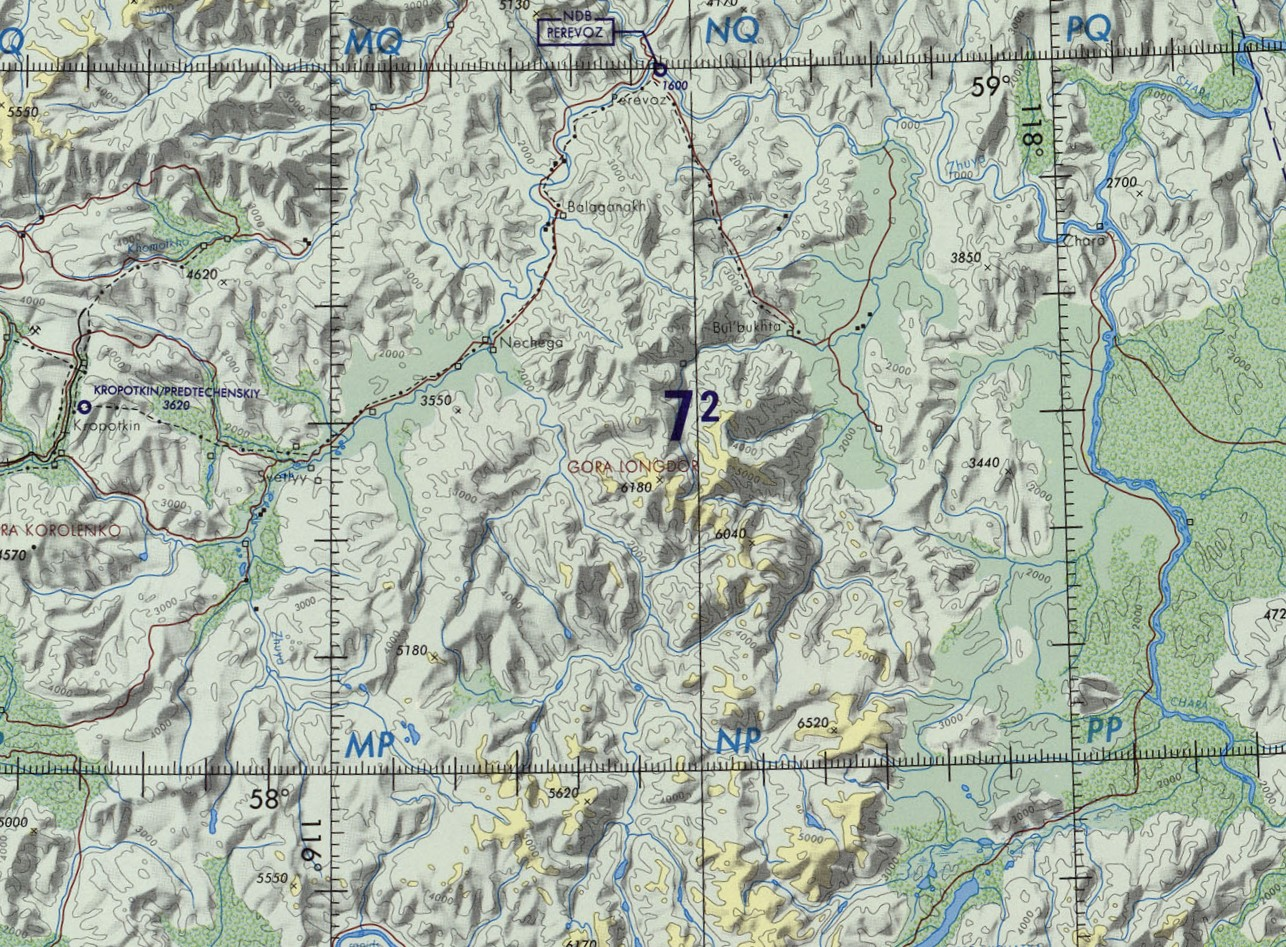
- Course of the Zhuya

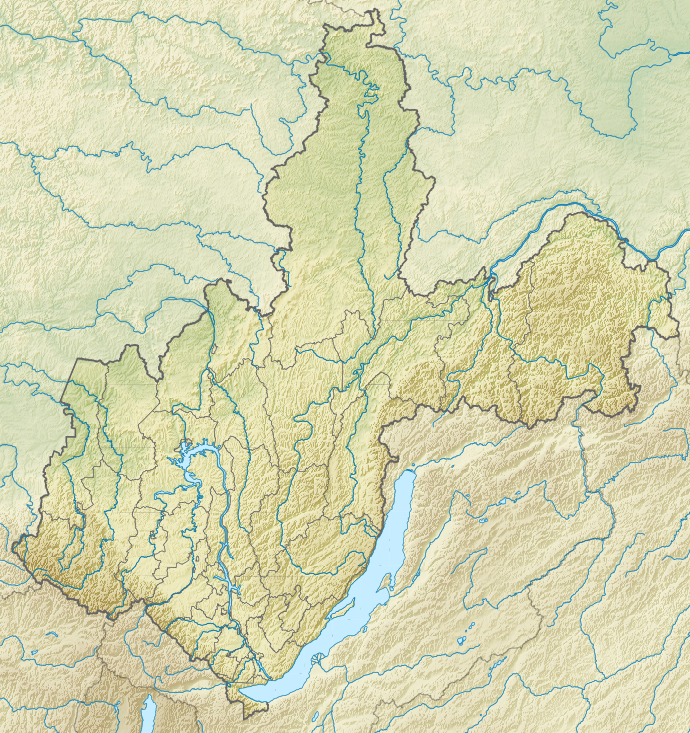
- Mouth location in Irkutsk Oblast, Russia

Location
- Country: Russia
- Federal subject: Irkutsk Oblast

Physical characteristics
- Source: Kropotkin Range, Patom Highlands
  - coordinates: 57°50′12″N 115°56′41″E
  - elevation: 1,100 m (3,600 ft)
- Mouth: Chara
  - location: Ust-Zhuya
  - coordinates: 58°45′44″N 118°09′25″E
  - elevation: 246 m (807 ft)
- Length: 337 km (209 mi)
- Basin size: 22,600 km^{2} (8,700 sq mi)
- Discharge
  - average: 54 m^{3}/s (1,900 cu ft/s)

Basin features
- Progression: Chara→ Olyokma→ Lena→ Laptev Sea

The Zhuya (Russian: Жуя) is a river in Irkutsk Oblast, East Siberia, Russian Federation. It is the second largest tributary of the Chara river in terms of length and area of its basin. The river is 337 kilometres (209 mi) long and has a drainage basin of 22,600 square kilometres (8,700 sq mi). The area is largely uninhabited, Svetly —a small goldmining place— and Perevoz villages are located by the river bank.

== History ==
The area of the Zhuya river was formerly renowned as part of the "Vitim Goldfields". The mines on the banks of the river were discovered and developed in the 19th century by Irkutsk gold miner K.P. Trapeznikov. There are still gold mining ventures in the Zhuya basin, especially in the area of its tributary, the Vacha.

== Course ==
The Zhuya is a left tributary of the Chara, of the Lena basin. Its source is in the northern slope of the Kropotkin Range. In its upper course the Zhuya flows roughly northwards and then northeastwards across the Patom Highlands, flowing across lake Tolendo. It turns in an eastward direction, meandering across a plain before joining the Chara near Ust-Zhuya, also known as Chara, an abolished settlement.

The longest tributaries of the Zhuya are the 146 km (91 mi) long Nechera from the right, and the 86 km (53 mi) long Khomolkho (Хомолхо) and 95 km (59 mi) long Vacha from the left. The river is navigable below its confluence with the Khomolkho. The Zhuya is frozen between October and May.

Lena basin.

== See also ==
- List of rivers of Russia
- Bodaibo District
