= Bolshoy Patom (village) =

Bolshoy Patom Большой Патом
- Selo
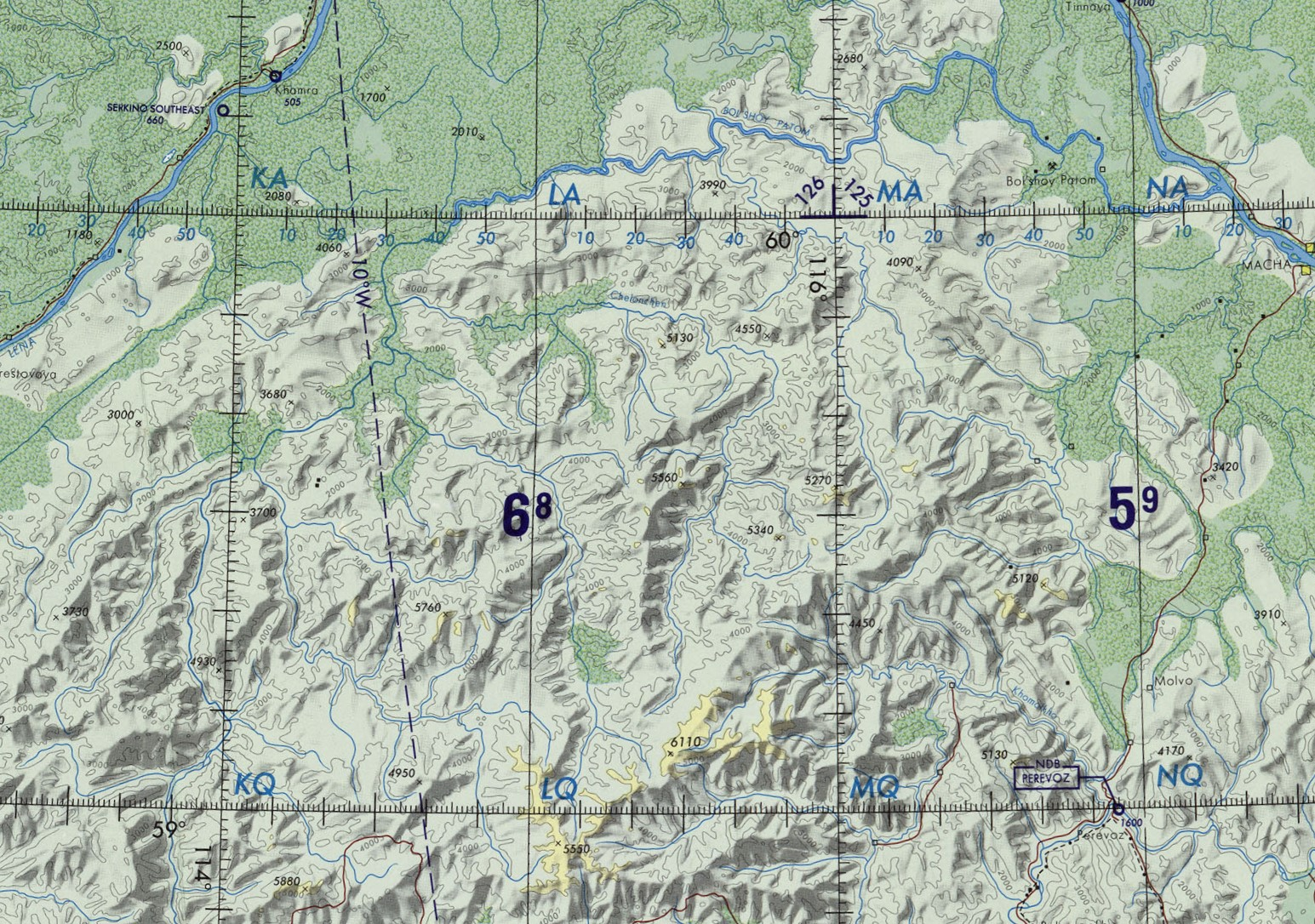
- Bolshoy Patom river course map section
- Interactive map of Bolshoy Patom
- Location of Bolshoy Patom Bolshoy Patom (Irkutsk Oblast)
- Coordinates: 60°04′36″N 116°53′51″E
- Country: Russia
- Federal subject: Irkutsk Oblast
- Administrative district: Bodaybinsky District

Population (2010 Census)
  - Total: 54
  - Estimate (2012): 52 (−3.7%)
- Time zone: UTC+8 (MSK+5)
- Postal codes: 666924, 666960
- OKTMO ID: 25602402106

Bolshoy Patom (Russian: Большой Патом) is a selo (village) in Bodaybinsky District of Irkutsk Oblast, Russia. It is part of the Zhuinsky Municipal Unit. Population: 54 (2010 census); 102 (2002 census);

== Geography ==
The locality is located 120 km (75 mi) to the north of Perevoz, the center of the Zhuinsky Municipality. It lies on the right bank of the Bolshoy Patom river, at the northeastern end of the Patom Highlands.
