= Patom Highlands =

Mountain range in Siberia

- Патомское нагорье
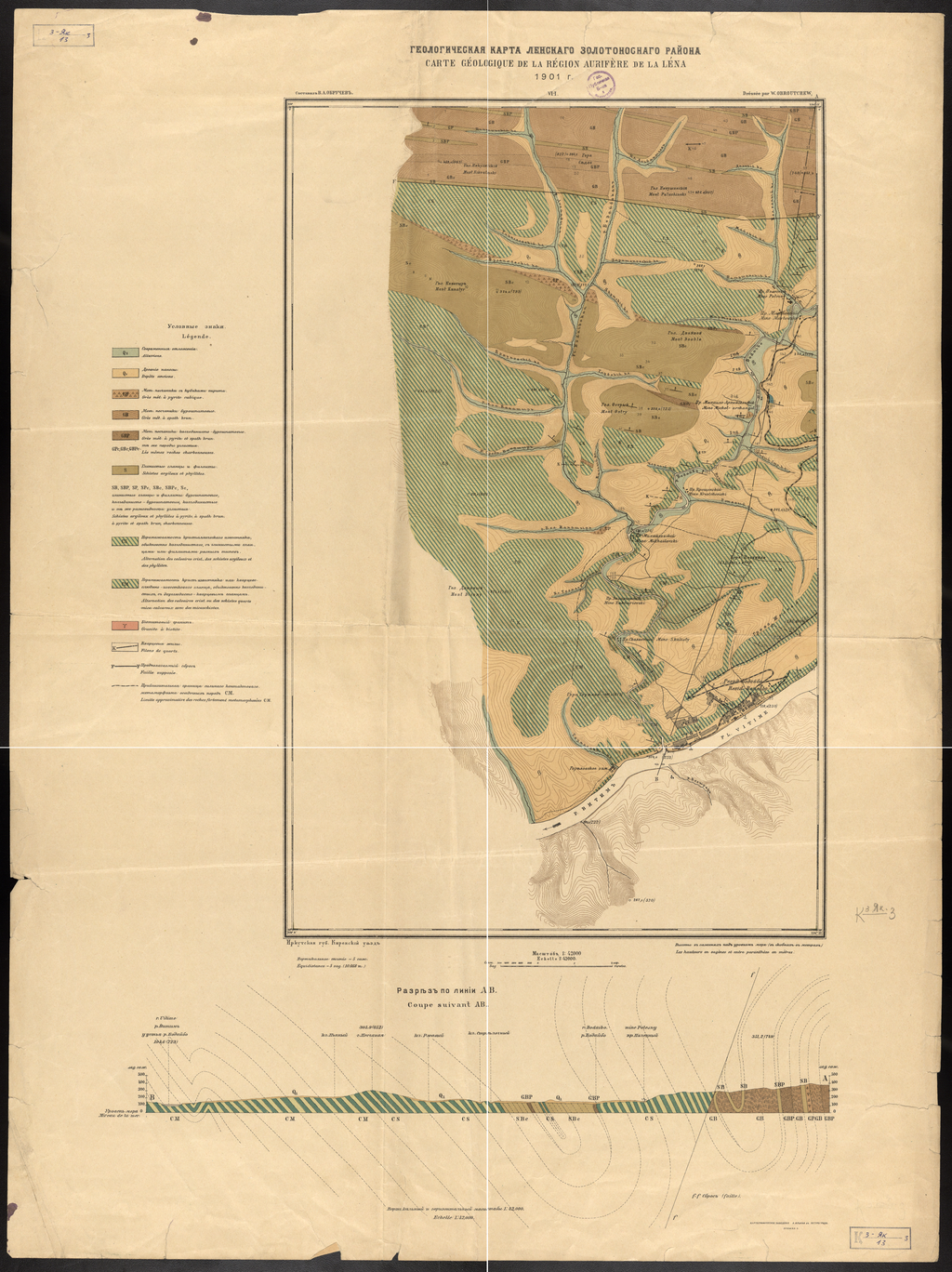
- Geological map of the Lena gold fields

Highest point
- Peak: unnamed
- Elevation: 1,904 m (6,247 ft)
- Coordinates: 57°39′08″N 117°47′19″E

Dimensions
- Length: 500 km (310 mi)
- Width: 300 km (190 mi)

Geography
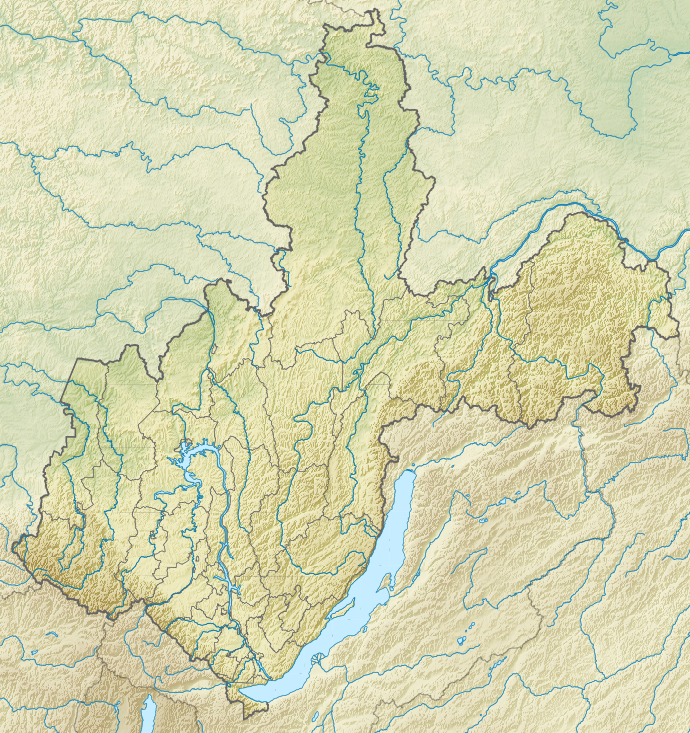
- Location within Irkutsk Oblast
- Country: Russia
- Federal subject: Irkutsk Oblast; Zabaykalsky Krai
- Range coordinates: 59°N 115°E
- Parent range: South Siberian System

Geology
- Orogeny: Alpine orogeny
- Rock ages: Proterozoic and Lower Paleozoic (North)
- Rock type(s): Crystalline schist, limestone, quartzite

Climbing
- Easiest route: From Bodaybo

The Patom Highlands (Russian: Патомское нагорье) are a mountainous area in Eastern Siberia, Russia. Administratively most of the territory of the uplands is part of Irkutsk Oblast, with a smaller section in northern Zabaykalsky Krai.

There are large deposits of gold in Bodaybo and Artyomovsky. Besides these two towns, other inhabited localities of the mountain region are: Mama, Perevoz, Kropotkin, Svetly and Bolshoy Patom, Bodaybinsky District.

== History ==
In 1912 there was a massacre of striking workers of the Lena Goldfields, located in the Patom Highlands between the Lena and Vitim rivers. Strikers were protesting about harsh working conditions. Soldiers of the Imperial Russian Army intervened and fired upon protesters, causing hundreds of casualties. The incident provoked wide outrage across pre-revolutionary Russia when Alexander Kerensky reported it in the Duma.

The name of the highlands was first proposed by Peter Kropotkin in 1868.

== Geography ==
The Patom Highlands are bound by rivers Lena, Vitim and Chara. To the north the valley of the Lena separates the highlands from the Lena Plateau and to the southwest the Vitim River, a right tributary of the Lena, separates it from the Stanovoy and North Baikal Highlands. To the south rises the Kropotkin Range and beyond it the valley of the Vitim. To the east flows the Chara River, a left tributary of the Olyokma River of the Lena basin, which separates the highland area from the Olyokma-Chara Plateau. To the southeast the Patom Highlands connect with the Kodar Range of Transbaikalia.

The river valleys cutting across the highlands are usually deep. Many rivers have their sources in the highlands, including some right tributaries of the Vitim, left tributaries of the Chara, such as the Zhuya and Malba, and right tributaries of Lena, such as the Big Patom and Little Patom Rivers. The average height of the mountainous area is between 1,200 meters (3,900 ft) and 1,300 meters (4,300 ft). The highest point is a 1,924 metres (6,312 ft) high unnamed summit located at 57°39′8″N 117°47′19″E in the southeastern end, southeast of Lake Nichatka in Zabaykalsky Krai. Golets Longdor is a 1,771 metres (5,810 ft) high peak located at 58°25′14″N 116°46′12″E.

The Patom crater is a cone of crushed limestone blocks located on the slopes of the Patom Highlands.

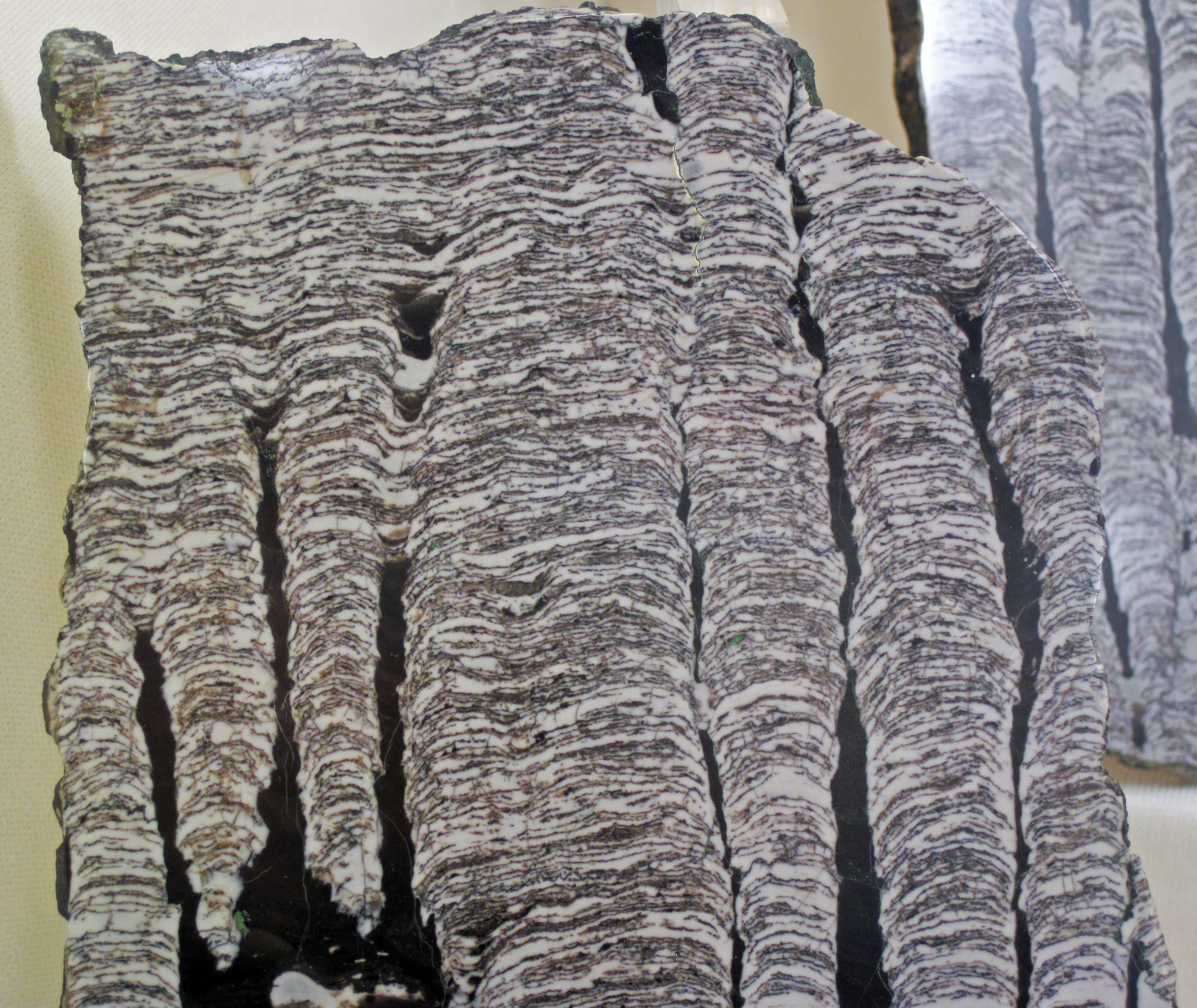
Sample of stromatolitic limestone — Chencha Formation, upper Neoproterozoic

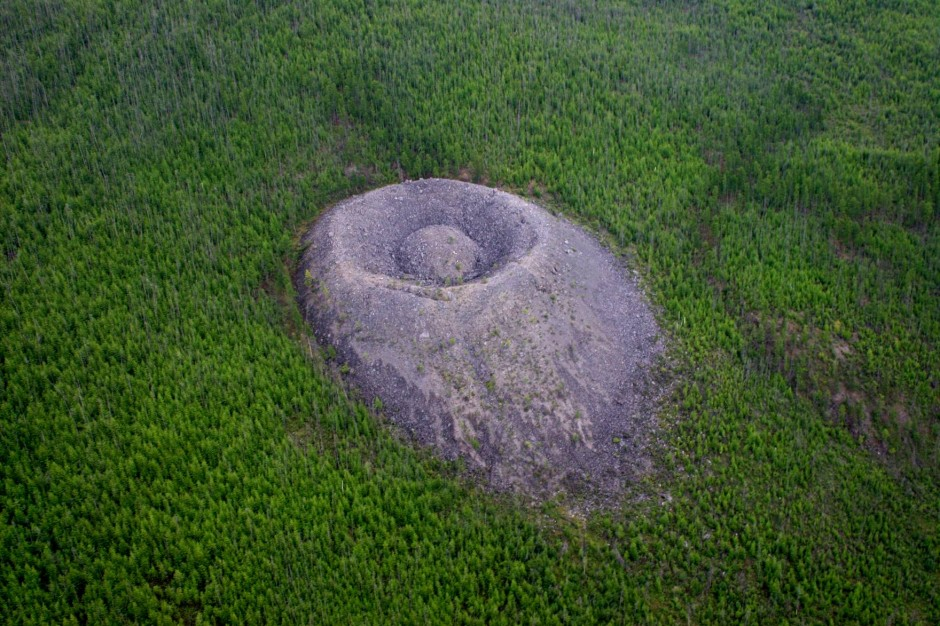
The Patom crater rising above the taiga of the highlands

== Climate and flora ==
The climate prevailing in the upland is extreme continental and cold. The average annual temperature is −5.5 °C (22.1 °F). In January the temperature goes down to −31 °C (−24 °F) and in July the temperature reaches a maximum of 18 °C (64 °F).

There are taiga forests of conifers, mostly larch, in the slopes of the mountains up to 900 meters (3,000 ft) to 1,100 meters (3,600 ft), often mixed with Siberian pine. At higher altitudes these give way to thickets of dwarf Siberian pine up to a height of 1,200 meters (3,900 ft). Further up the mountaintops are covered with stony tundra.

== See also ==
- Lena Goldfields massacre
- Lena Gold Mining Partnership
