= Bolshoy Patom =

Bolshoy Patom Большой Патом
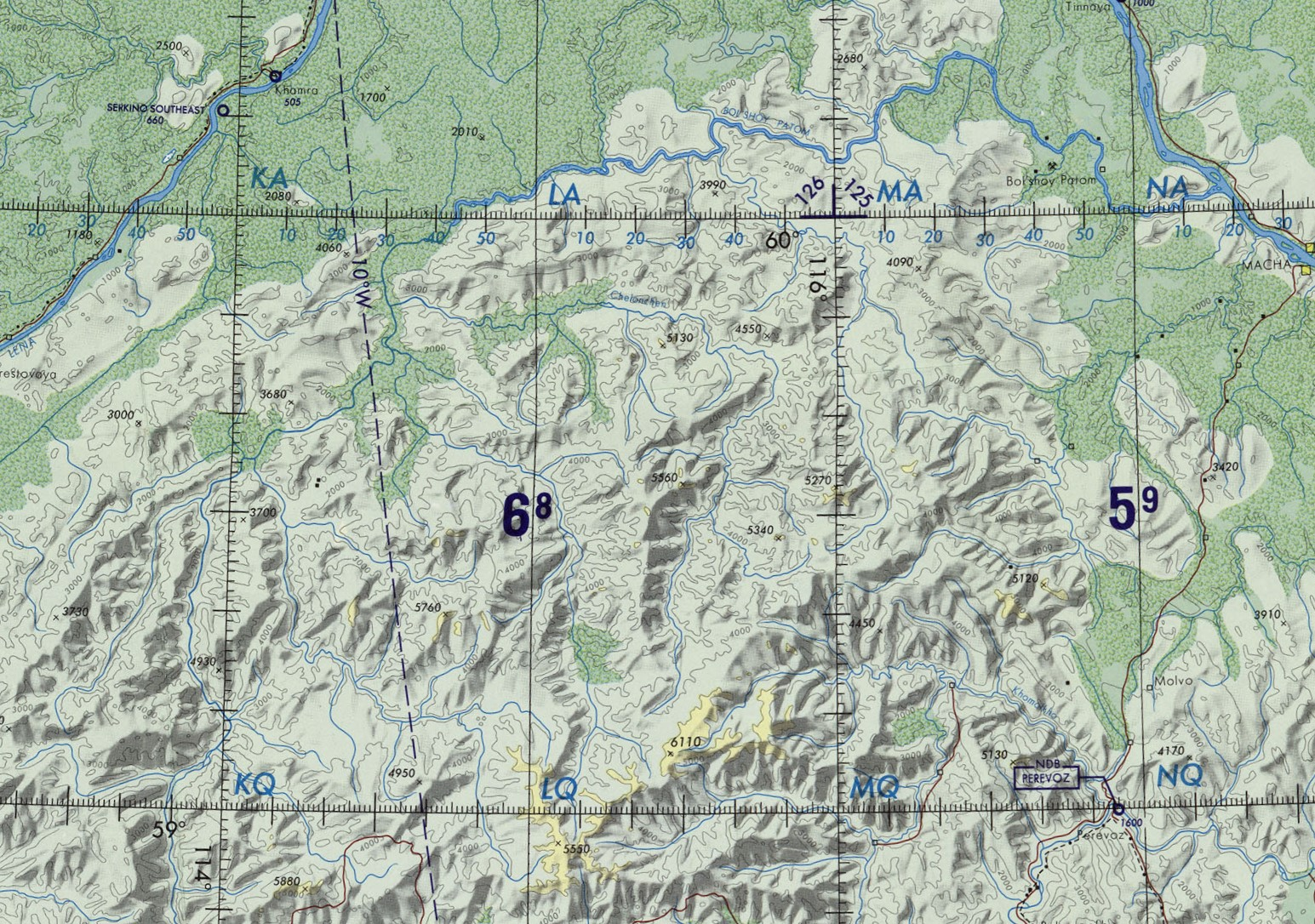
- Bolshoy Patom river course map section

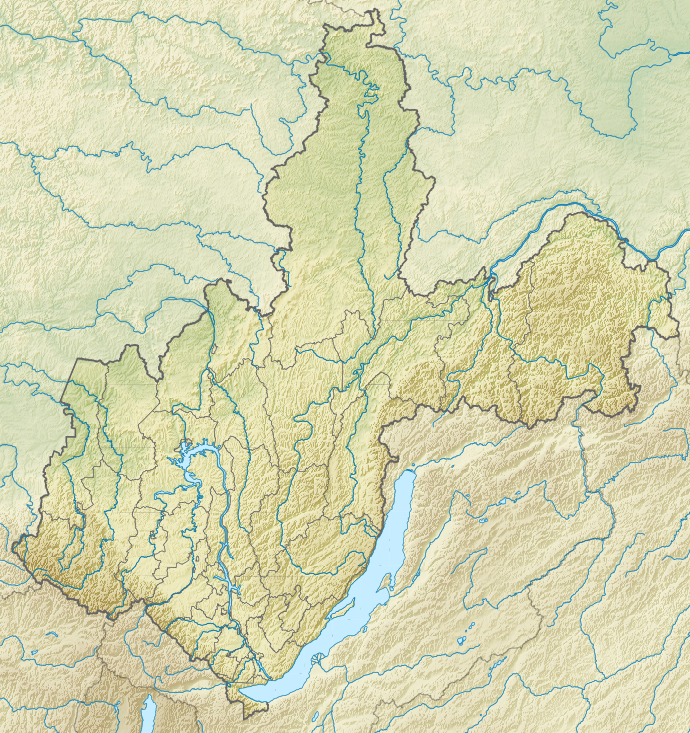
- Mouth location in Irkutsk Oblast, Russia

Location
- Country: Russia

Physical characteristics
- Source
  - location: Patom Highlands
  - coordinates: 58°50′24″N 115°26′45″E
  - elevation: 842.5 m (2,764 ft)
- Mouth: Lena
  - coordinates: 60°02′23″N 117°18′10″E
  - elevation: 145 m (476 ft)
- Length: 570 km (350 mi)
- Basin size: 28,400 km^{2} (11,000 sq mi)
- Discharge
  - average: 350 m^{3}/s (12,000 cu ft/s)

Basin features
- Progression: Lena→ Laptev Sea

The Bolshoy Patom (Russian: Большой Патом), "Big Patom", is a river in Irkutsk Oblast, Russia. It is the 11th longest tributary of the Lena with a length of 570 kilometres (350 mi) and a drainage basin area of 28,400 square kilometres (11,000 mi^{2}).

Bolshoy Patom village is located by the riverbank in its lower course. Tourists visit the Bolshoy Patom river mainly for rafting and kayaking. In the International scale of river difficulty the Bolshoy Patom is a Class III and IV river. There are picturesque white limestone cliffs flanking a number of stretches of the Bolshoy Patom.

== Course ==
The Bolshoy Patom is a right tributary of the Lena. It has its sources in the Patom Highlands, roughly 257 kilometres (160 mi) north of Bodaybo. The river flows first in an approximately western direction across the highland area within a gorge cut into the plateau bedrock. Near the slopes of the northern end of the Kropotkin Range it bends and flows roughly northwards with many rapids. Then it bends slightly and flows northeastwards parallel to the Lena that skirts the highlands further to the west. The area named "Forty Islands" (Сорок Островов) is located near the confluence of the Satalakh, 377 km (234 mi) from the mouth, where the river splits into channels, forming islands in between.

In its last major bend, the Bolshoy Patom heads eastwards. The river channel widens and the flow slows down in its last 250 km (160 mi) stretch across a wide floodplain. Finally the Bolshoy Patom meets the right bank of the Lena near at the border of the Sakha Republic (Yakutia), 2,334 kilometres (1,450 mi) from its mouth. The town of Macha lies just a few miles downstream from the confluence.

The Bolshoy Patom has several tributaries that are over 100 km (62 mi) long. The largest are the Bolshaya Taimendra, Cheloichen, Tonoda and Khaverga from the right; and the Tamper and Muoda from the left. There are 445 lakes in the river basin with a total area of 15.6 km^{2} (6.0 sq mi). During spring floods it may overflow its banks and flood surrounding areas. The river freezes between October and May. In its last stretch the Bolshoy Patom is navigable during the high-water period of the year.

Basin of the Lena

== See also ==
- List of rivers of Russia
