= Lena massacre =

1912 shooting of striking miners and protesters by the Imperial Russian Army

Coordinates: 58°11′07″N 114°35′01″E

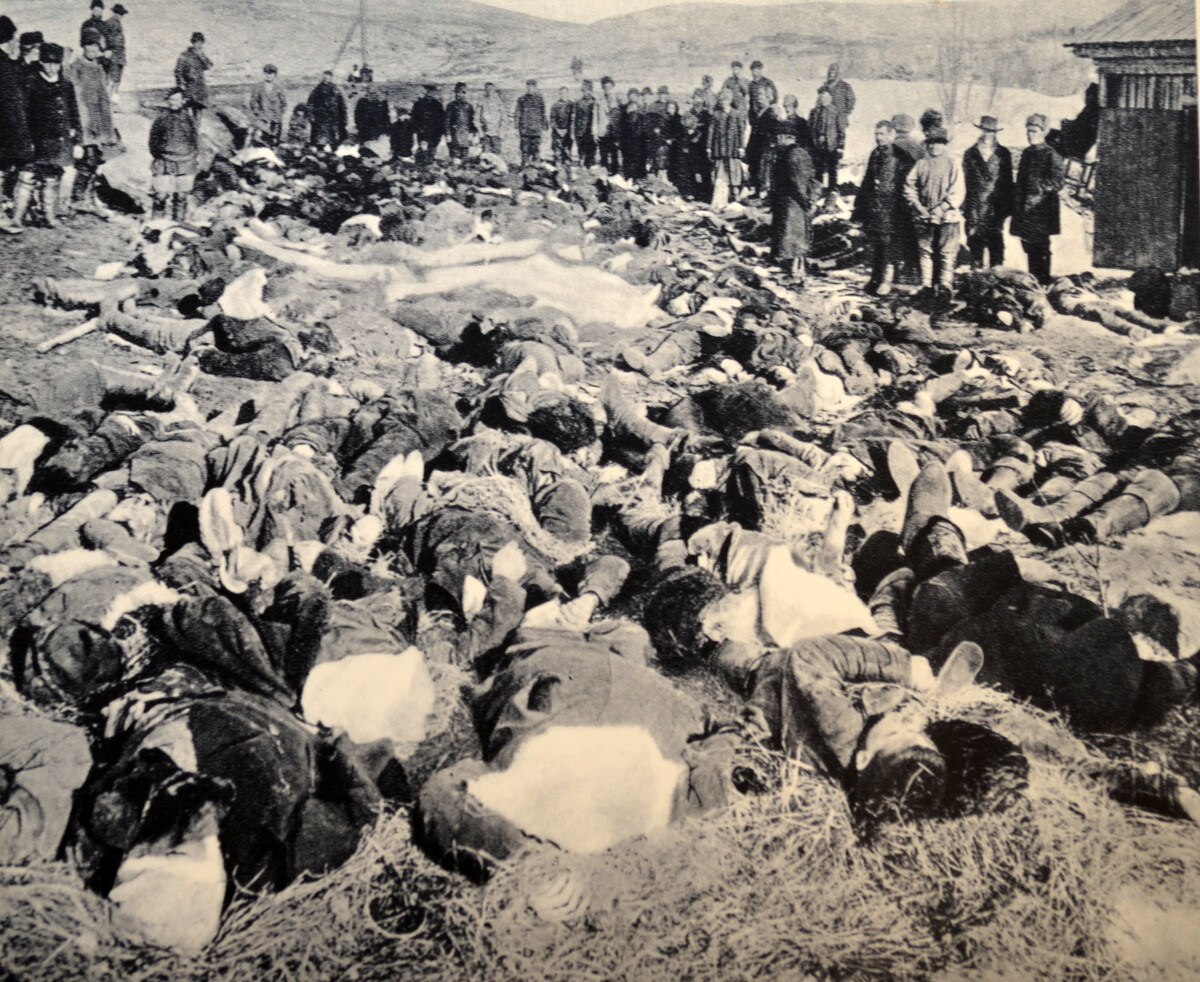
The victims of the Lena massacre

The Lena Massacre or Lena Execution (Russian: Ленский расстрел, romanized: Lensky rasstrel) refers to the shooting of goldfield workers on strike in northeast Siberia near the Lena River on 17 April [O.S. 4 April] 1912.

The strike had been provoked by exceptionally harsh working conditions, and when the strike committee was arrested, a large crowd marched in protest. They were fired on by soldiers of the Imperial Russian Army, causing hundreds of casualties. The incident did much to stimulate revolutionary sentiment in Russia, and Alexander Kerensky's reporting of it in the Duma brought him to public notice for the first time.

== Background ==
The incident took place at the goldfields of the Lena Gold Mining Joint Stock Company (Lenzoloto), located along the shores of the Lena River, about 28 miles northeast of the town of Bodaybo in the north of Irkutsk Oblast. The venture produced large profits for its British and Russian shareholders, who included Aleksei Putilov (a director), Count Sergei Witte, and Empress Maria Fyodorovna. At the time of the strike, 66% of its shares were owned by Lena Goldfields, a company registered in London and traded in London, Paris and Saint Petersburg. 70% of Lena Goldfields, or about 46% of Lenzoloto, was in the hands of Russian businessmen and managed by a committee of the Russian investors of the company; 30% of Lena Goldfields, or about 20% of Lenzoloto, was in the hands of British businessmen. The remaining 30% of Lenzoloto was owned by the Gintsburg family (also spelled Günzburg and other variants) and their companions.

Working conditions were exceptionally harsh, with miners having to work fifteen to sixteen hours a day. For every thousand workers, there were more than 700 accidents. Part of the meagre salary was often used to pay fines. The other part of it was given in the form of coupons to be used in stores at the mine itself. All this led to a spontaneous strike at the Andreyevsky goldfield on 13 March. An immediate cause for the strike was distribution of rotten meat at one of these stores.

With the Central Strike Committee and Central Bureau (P.N. Batashev, G.V. Cherepakhin, R.I. Zelionko, M.I. Lebedev, and others) in charge of the strike, it had extended to all the goldfields, and included over 6,000 workers, by mid-March. On 17 March, the workers established their demands: an eight-hour workday, a 30% raise in wages, the elimination of fines, and the improvement of food delivery. None of these demands were met by the administration.

== Massacre ==
The tsarist government sent troops from Kirensk to Bodaybo, and on the night of 17 April, all members of the strike committee were arrested. The next morning, the workers demanded their immediate release. That afternoon, some 2,500 people marched towards the Nadezhdinsky goldfield to deliver a complaint about the arbitrariness of the authorities to the prosecutor's office. The workers were met by soldiers, who began shooting at the crowd by the order of Captain Treshchenkov, resulting in hundreds of dead and wounded. The local newspaper Zvezda, among others, reported 270 dead and 250 wounded.

== Reactions ==
The massacre triggered a wave of strikes and protests. Soon afterwards, the administration offered its workers a new contract, which failed to gain their satisfaction. News of the massacre provoked nationwide strikes and protest meetings totalling more than 300,000 participants, with 700 political strikes during the month of April, and 1,000 strikes on 1 May in the St. Petersburg area alone. The strike continued until 25 August, when the last of the workers withdrew from the mines and moved elsewhere. Altogether, an estimated 9,000 employees and family members abandoned the goldfields. The number of strikes in Russia had sharply declined from 14,000 in 1905 to just 222 in 1910. Next year it increased to 466 and 1,918 in 1912. Lenin argued that the massacre had 'inflamed the masses with a revolutionary fire'.

The massacre was protested by the Social Democratic leaders and the Socialists Revolutionary leaders who were in Paris at the time of the event. Socialist parties, like the Bolsheviks and the Mensheviks, used that tragedy and the public outrage it sparked to further promote their political leanings throughout the Empire.

The massacre also triggered massive walkouts as a form of generalised opposition to the Tsarist political system through the yearly commemoration of the victims of excessive force during the Lena massacre. This commemorative event held deep significance to the public and attracted broad sympathy. The massacre contributed to general discontent throughout society, shattering the calm restored in the Empire after the 1905 Revolution. The massacre greatly increased tension and unrest in factories and workshops, where the demands for better pay and conditions had yet to reach throughout the Empire.

The Duma also passed a law which introduced insurance benefits, in times of sickness and accident as well as creating worker representatives, two months after the Lena massacre. This law improved the conditions of workers across the Empire.

== Commission of investigation ==
The public demanded the government send a commission to the goldfields to investigate the incident. Interior Minister Makarov dismissed the massacre, "So it was. So it will be." The Duma commission on the Lena massacre was headed by Alexander Kerensky. His colourful reports of the incident greatly promoted widespread knowledge of the event, and also advanced his career from a backbencher to a popular leader of the Duma, as well as head of the Provisional Government of 1917. Joseph Stalin declared: "The Lena shots broke the ice of silence, and the river of popular resentment is flowing again. The ice has broken. It has started!"

== Lenin ==
It has been suggested that Vladimir Ilyich Lenin adopted his more popular alias after the river Lena—Lenin—after this event, although he had in fact started using it years earlier, in 1901.

== See also ==
- List of massacres in Russia
- Patom Highlands
