= Bodaybo Airport =

Regional airport in Irkutsk Oblast, Russia

- IATA: ODO; ICAO: UIKB

Summary
- Location: Bodaybo, Irkutsk Oblast, Russia
- Coordinates: 57°51′59″N 114°14′33″E

Map
- Location of the airport

Runways
Direction	Length		Surface
Direction	m	ft	Surface
06/24	1,657	5,436	Dirt

Bodaybo Airport (IATA: ODO, ICAO: UIKB) is a regional airport built in Bodaybo, Irkutsk Oblast, Russia, during World War II for the Alaska-Siberian (ALSIB) air route used to ferry American Lend-Lease aircraft to the Eastern Front. In 2017 it handled 51,910 passengers.

== Airlines and destinations ==
Airlines	Destinations
IrAero	Irkutsk

== See also ==
- List of airports in Russia
