= Bodaybo =

Town in Irkutsk Oblast, Russia

Bodaybo Бодайбо
- Town
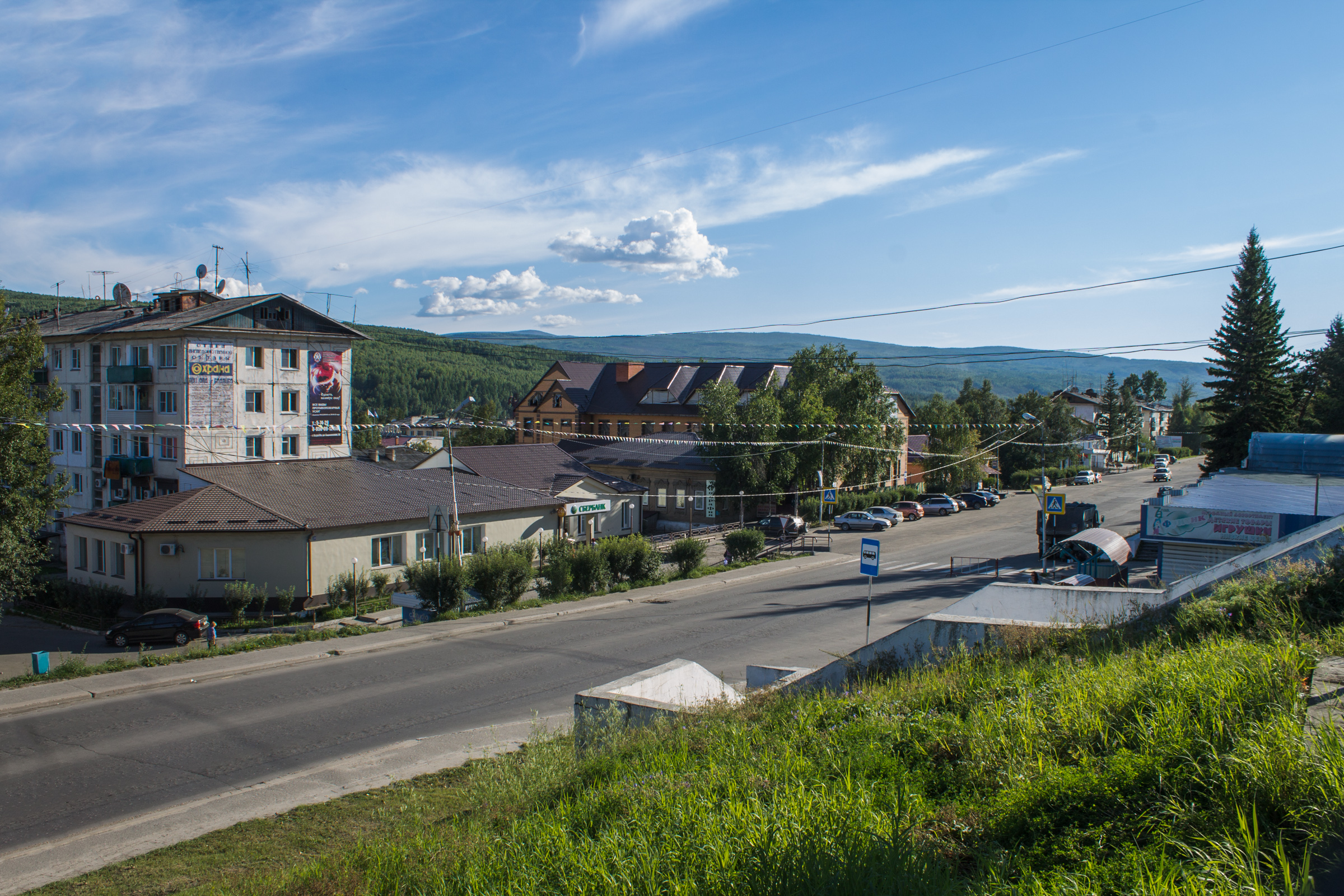
- City of Bodaybo

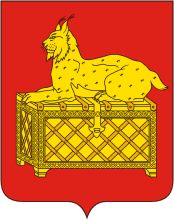
- Coat of arms
- Interactive map of Bodaybo
- Location of Bodaybo Bodaybo (Irkutsk Oblast)
- Coordinates: 57°52′N 114°12′E
- Country: Russia
- Federal subject: Irkutsk Oblast
- Administrative district: Bodaybinsky District
- Founded: 1864
- Town status since: 1925
- Elevation: 280 m (920 ft)

Population (2010 Census)
  - Total: 15,340
  - Estimate (2021): 8,921 (−41.8%)

Administrative status
  - Capital of: Bodaybinsky District

Municipal status
  - Municipal district: Bodaybinsky Municipal District
  - Urban settlement: Bodaybinskoye Urban Settlement
  - Capital of: Bodabinsky Municipal District, Bodaybinskoye Urban Settlement
- Time zone: UTC+8 (MSK+5)
- Postal codes: 666900–666902, 666904
- Dialing code: +7 39561
- OKTMO ID: 25602101001
- Website: bodaybo38.ru

Bodaybo (Russian: Бодайбо, IPA: [bədɐjˈbo]) is a town and the administrative center of Bodaybinsky District in Irkutsk Oblast, Russia. It is located 1,290 kilometers (800 mi) from Irkutsk, the administrative center of the oblast.

== Geography ==
The town is located in the Patom Highlands, on the right bank of the Vitim River at its confluence with the Bodaybo River. Besides Bodaybo, some of the settlements of the district are Aprilsk, Artyomovsky, Balakhninsky, Kropotkin, Mamakan, Svetly, Vasilievsky, Perevoz and Bolshoy Patom.

== History ==
It was founded in 1864 and served the needs of the local gold mining industry. The Lena massacre took place near Bodaybo in 1912. It was granted town status in 1925.

=== Vitim event ===
The Vitim event occurred on September 25, 2002 near the town. It was believed to be caused by a bolide or a comet nucleus impact.

== Administrative and municipal status ==
Within the framework of administrative divisions, Bodaybo serves as the administrative center of Bodaybinsky District, to which it is directly subordinated. As a municipal division, the town of Bodaybo, together with the selo of Nerpo in Bodaybinsky District, is incorporated within Bodaybinsky Municipal District as Bodaybinskoye Urban Settlement.

== Transportation ==
The Bodaybo Airport is the only airport in Bodaybo and is quite small. It is served by Angara Airlines which flies only to Irkutsk.

== Climate ==
Bodaybo has a subarctic climate (Köppen climate classification Dfc), with bitterly cold winters and warm summers. Precipitation is quite low, but falls mostly in summer, with the climate being arid at other times of the year.

Climate data for Bodaybo
Month	Jan	Feb	Mar	Apr	May	Jun	Jul	Aug	Sep	Oct	Nov	Dec	Year
Record high °C (°F)	3.3 (37.9)	4.5 (40.1)	11.8 (53.2)	22.7 (72.9)	32.7 (90.9)	39.6 (103.3)	38.6 (101.5)	36.6 (97.9)	28.7 (83.7)	19.1 (66.4)	10.3 (50.5)	4.2 (39.6)	39.6 (103.3)
Mean daily maximum °C (°F)	−26.0 (−14.8)	−20.0 (−4.0)	−6.6 (20.1)	4.5 (40.1)	13.7 (56.7)	22.9 (73.2)	26.1 (79.0)	22.5 (72.5)	13.0 (55.4)	1.1 (34.0)	−14.1 (6.6)	−24.1 (−11.4)	1.1 (34.0)
Daily mean °C (°F)	−30.4 (−22.7)	−26.0 (−14.8)	−14.8 (5.4)	−2.3 (27.9)	6.6 (43.9)	14.6 (58.3)	18.1 (64.6)	14.8 (58.6)	6.8 (44.2)	−3.3 (26.1)	−18.4 (−1.1)	−28.1 (−18.6)	−5.2 (22.6)
Mean daily minimum °C (°F)	−34.2 (−29.6)	−31.1 (−24.0)	−21.7 (−7.1)	−8.3 (17.1)	0.1 (32.2)	7.6 (45.7)	11.7 (53.1)	9.6 (49.3)	2.8 (37.0)	−6.5 (20.3)	−22.2 (−8.0)	−31.8 (−25.2)	−10.3 (13.4)
Record low °C (°F)	−55.1 (−67.2)	−51.4 (−60.5)	−46.7 (−52.1)	−33.7 (−28.7)	−14.3 (6.3)	−3.7 (25.3)	0.5 (32.9)	−1.8 (28.8)	−8.9 (16.0)	−32.9 (−27.2)	−45.3 (−49.5)	−52.1 (−61.8)	−55.1 (−67.2)
Average precipitation mm (inches)	22.9 (0.90)	13.9 (0.55)	10.6 (0.42)	15.5 (0.61)	34.8 (1.37)	60.1 (2.37)	75.1 (2.96)	72.9 (2.87)	53.2 (2.09)	28.2 (1.11)	30.1 (1.19)	26.0 (1.02)	443.3 (17.46)
Average precipitation days (≥ 0.1 mm)	25.3	20.7	17.0	16.8	13.2	13.3	14.8	14.5	16.8	20.8	24.6	22.2	220
Average relative humidity (%)	77.5	76.0	68.4	63.0	59.5	66.4	72.6	76.1	80.0	77.5	81.1	78.4	73.0
Mean monthly sunshine hours	22	89	145	200	192	191	238	195	105	71	43	13	1,504
Source 1: climatebase.ru (1937-2005)
Source 2: NOAA (sun only, 1961-1990)
