= Bodaybinsky District =

Bodaybinsky District Бодайбинский район (Russian)
- District
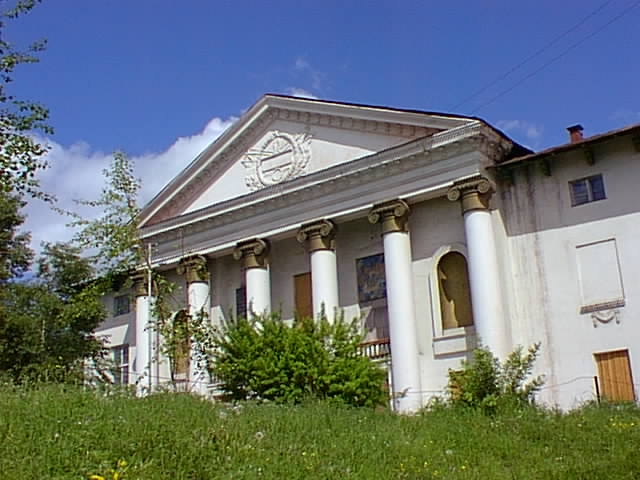
- Culture House, Bodaybinsky District

- Coat of arms
- Location of Bodaybinsky District (#5) in northeast Irkutsk Oblast
- Coordinates: 58°30′N 116°00′E
- Country: Russia
- Federal subject: Irkutsk Oblast
- Established: 28 June 1926
- Administrative center: Bodaybo

Area
  - Total: 92,000 km^{2} (36,000 sq mi)

Population (2010 Census)
  - Total: 7,887
  - Density: 0.086/km^{2} (0.22/sq mi)
  - Urban: 79.1%
  - Rural: 20.9%

Administrative structure
  - Inhabited localities: 1 cities/towns, 4 urban-type settlements, 7 rural localities

Municipal structure
  - Municipally incorporated as: Bodaybinsky Municipal District
  - Municipal divisions: 5 urban settlements, 1 rural settlements
- Time zone: UTC+8 (MSK+5)
- OKTMO ID: 25602000
- Website: http://www.pribaikal.ru/bodajbo.html

Bodaybinsky District (Russian: Бодайбинский райо́н) is an administrative district, one of the thirty-three in Irkutsk Oblast, Russia. Municipally, it is incorporated as Bodaybinsky Municipal District. The area of the district is 92,000 square kilometers (36,000 sq mi). Its administrative center is the town of Bodaybo. Population: 7,887 (2010 census); 10,817 (2002 Census); 16,166 (1989 Soviet census).

== Geography ==
It is located in the Patom Highlands, as well as partly in the Stanovoy Highlands, in the northeastern zone of the oblast. The district is largely mountainous and its highest point is 2,988 metres (9,803 ft) high Pik Martena located in the Kodar Range. It borders with Yakutia (Sakha Republic) in the north and northeast, with Buryatia and Zabaykalsky Krai in the south and southeast, and with the Mamsko-Chuysky District in the west. The Zhuya river cuts across the district and the Bolshoy Patom flows in a wide arch to the west and to the north. Besides Bodaybo, some of the settlements of the district are Aprilsk, Artyomovsky, Balakhninsky, Kropotkin, Mamakan, Svetly, Vasilievsky, Perevoz and Bolshoy Patom.

== Administrative and municipal status ==
Within the framework of administrative divisions, Bodaybinsky District is one of the thirty-three in the oblast. The town of Bodaybo serves as its administrative center.

As a municipal division, the district is incorporated as Bodaybinsky Municipal District.

== See also ==
- Lena Plateau
