= Yulia Galyamina =

Russian politician, linguist

- Юлия Галямина
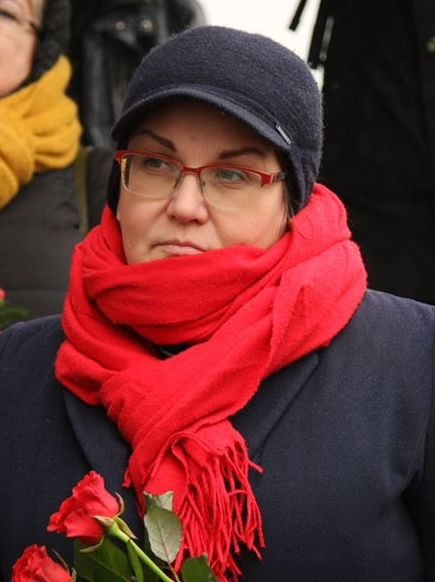
- Galyamina in 2019
- Born: Yulia Yevgenyevna Galyamina; 23 January 1973 (age 53); Moscow, Soviet Union
- Education: Russian State University for the Humanities
- Occupations: Linguist, activist
- Political party: 5th of December Party

Yulia Yevgenyevna Galyamina (Russian: Юлия Евгеньевна Галямина; born 23 January 1973) is a Russian linguist and political activist.

She is a member of the Yabloko political party and has been often arrested and jailed for the organization and high-profile participation in protests against Vladimir Putin.

In 2018, together with anthropologist Nikita Petrov, Yulia Galyamina became active helping to raise funds for the treatment of Ket folk singer Alexander Kotusov (1955–2019) when he was terminally ill and stuck in Kellog, his isolated native village.

In December 2020, she received a suspended sentence of two years of corrective labor colony for repeated violations of the rules for conducting rallies and pickets (article 212.1 of the Russian Criminal Code).

In March 2022, Galyamina was detained and held in custody pending trial, charged with violating the law on public events by trying to organize a protest against Russia's invasion of Ukraine. On 5 March, she was sentenced to 30 days in jail. In November 2026 she received a fine for objecting a search in her phone by a policeman in a train station.

== See also ==
- Opposition to Vladimir Putin in Russia
