= Svetlogorsk Urban Settlement =

Svetlogorsk Urban Settlement is the name of several municipal formations in Russia.

Modern entities

- Svetlogorsk Urban Settlement, a municipal formation which the town of district significance of Svetlogorsk in Svetlogorsky District of Kaliningrad Oblast is incorporated as

Historical entities

- Svetlogorsk Urban Settlement, a municipal formation which the Work Settlement of Svetlogorsk in Turukhansky District of Krasnoyarsk Krai was incorporated as before being demoted in status to that of a rural settlement in January 2014

== See also ==
- Svetlogorsk (disambiguation)
- Svetlogorsky (disambiguation)
