= Lake Dynda =

Freshwater lake in Turukhansky District, Krasnoyarsk Krai, Russia

- Дында
- Location in Krasnoyarsk Krai, Russia
- Location: Turukhansky District
- Coordinates: 62°49′N 85°43′E
- Basin countries: Russia
- Max. length: 8 km (5.0 mi)
- Max. width: 1.5 km (0.93 mi)
- Max. depth: 4.5 m (15 ft)

Lake Dynda (Russian: Дында) is a freshwater lake in Turukhansky District, Krasnoyarsk Krai, Russia. The lake is located in the Upper Taz Nature Reserve.

== Geography ==
The lake lies in the basin of the Taz river, close to its source, and near the basin of the Yeloguy River which flows to the southeast of the lake. Lake Dynda extends in a roughly northwest–southeast direction. Its depth is between 3 m (9.8 ft) and 4.5 m (15 ft).

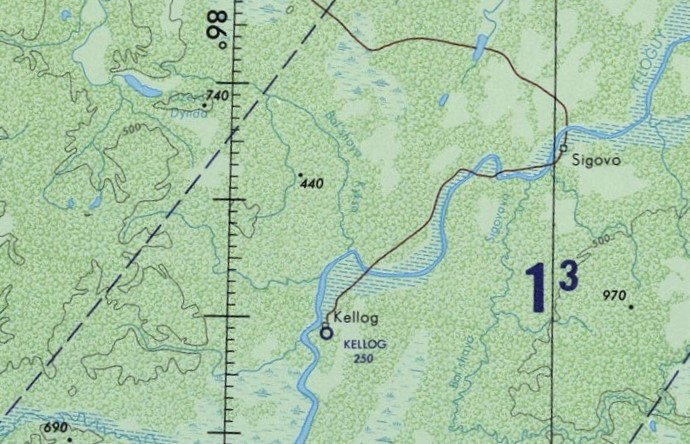
Map section centered on Kellog, a section of the Yeloguy River and Lake Dynda, the places where folk singer Alexander Kotusov found inspiration for his songs.

== See also ==
- List of lakes of Russia
