= Yeloguy =

River in Krasnoyarsk Krai, Russia

Yeloguy Елогуй
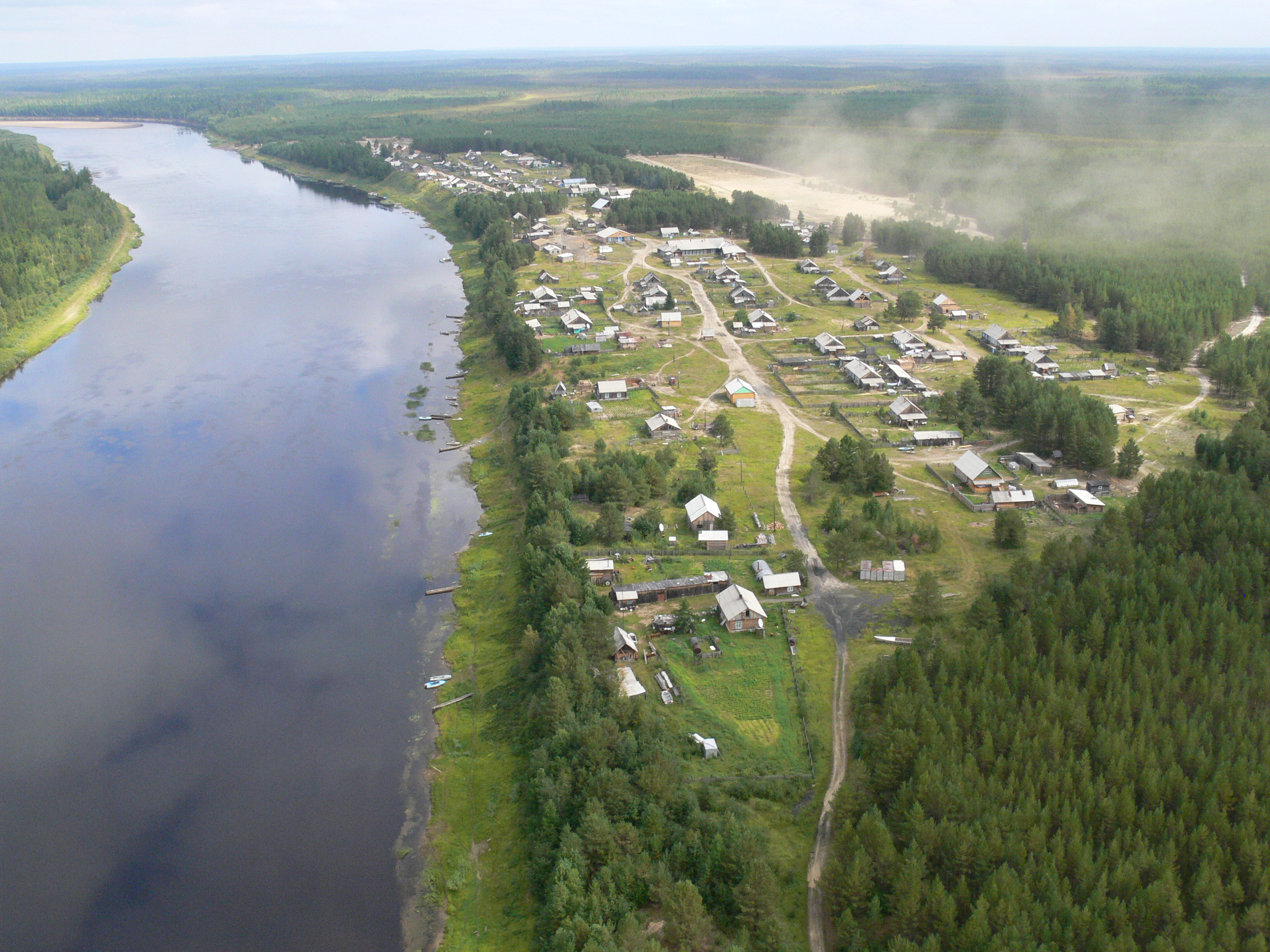
- The village of Kellog, along the banks of the Yeloguy.

- Mouth location in Krasnoyarsk Krai, Russia

Location
- Country: Turukhan District, Krasnoyarsk Krai, Russia

Physical characteristics
- Source
  - location: West Siberian Plain
  - coordinates: 61°58′42″N 85°11′12″E
  - elevation: 121 m (397 ft)
- Mouth: Yenisey
  - coordinates: 63°12′52″N 87°45′28″E
  - elevation: 17 m (56 ft)
- Length: 464 km (288 mi)
- Basin size: 25,100 km^{2} (9,700 sq mi)
- Discharge
  - average: 166 m^{3}/s (5,900 cu ft/s)

Basin features
- Progression: Yenisey→ Kara Sea

The Yeloguy (Russian: Елогуй) is a river in Krasnoyarsk Krai, Russia. It is one of the main tributaries of the Yenisey. Its basin marks the eastern limit of the Siberian Uvaly.

The Yeloguy is 464 kilometres (288 mi) long, and the area of its basin is 25,100 square kilometres (9,700 mi^{2}). The lower reaches of the river are navigable downstream from Kellog. The Yeloguy was one of the places where Ket singer Alexander Kotusov found inspiration for his songs.

== Course ==
The Yeloguy has its source in the West Siberian Plain. It forms at the confluence of two short rivers, the Levy Yeloguy and the Pravy Yeloguy, both roughly 20 kilometres (12 mi) long. It flows roughly northeastwards across the flatland and in its lower course it meanders in the mostly flat and swampy taiga. About 30 kilometres (19 mi) before the mouth, the Crooked Yeloguy (Krivoy Yeloguy) splits to the right and flows roughly parallel to the main river.

The Yeloguy joins the left bank of the Yenisey forming a many-branched delta near Verkhne Imbatskoye (Verkhneimbatsk) village, located on the facing bank of the Yenisey. The confluence is located roughly halfway between the mouths of the rivers Sym and Turukhan. The river freezes in October and stays frozen until mid-May.

Its main tributaries are the Kellog, Bolshaya Sigovaya and the Tyna.

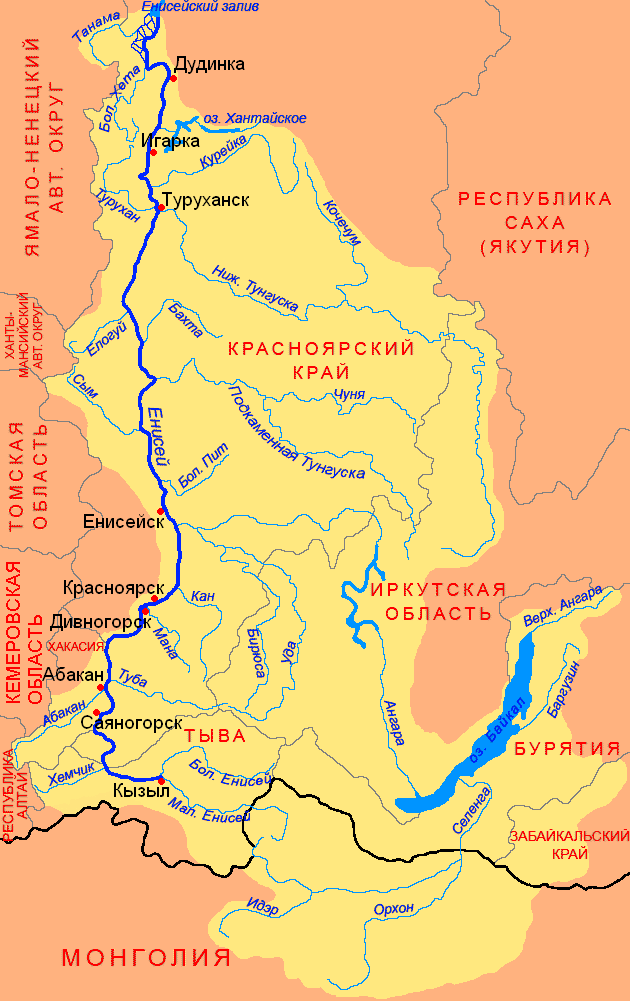
Basin of the Yenisey. The Yeloguy in the upper left.

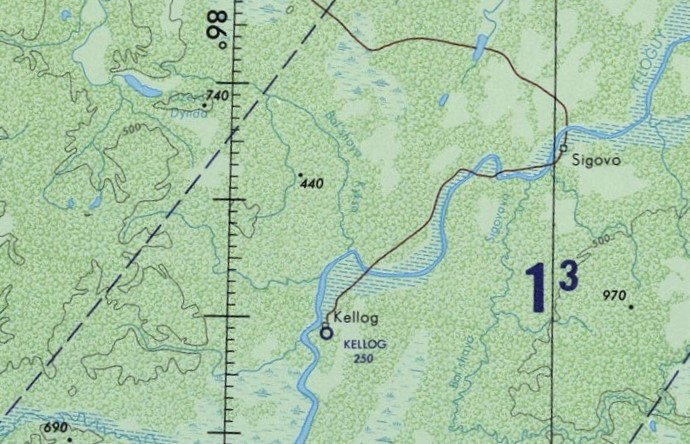
Map section centered on Kellog, a section of the Yeloguy River and Lake Dynda, the places where Alexander Kotusov found inspiration for his songs.

== Protected area ==
A 7,476 km^{2} (2,886 sq mi) taiga zone of the lower course of the river, including its confluence with the Tyna, was established as the Yeloguy Nature Reserve (Елогуйский Заказник) on 10 March 1987. The protected area is under the Central Siberia Nature Reserve.

== See also ==
- List of rivers of Russia
