= Ket mythology =

Mythology of an ethnic group in Siberia

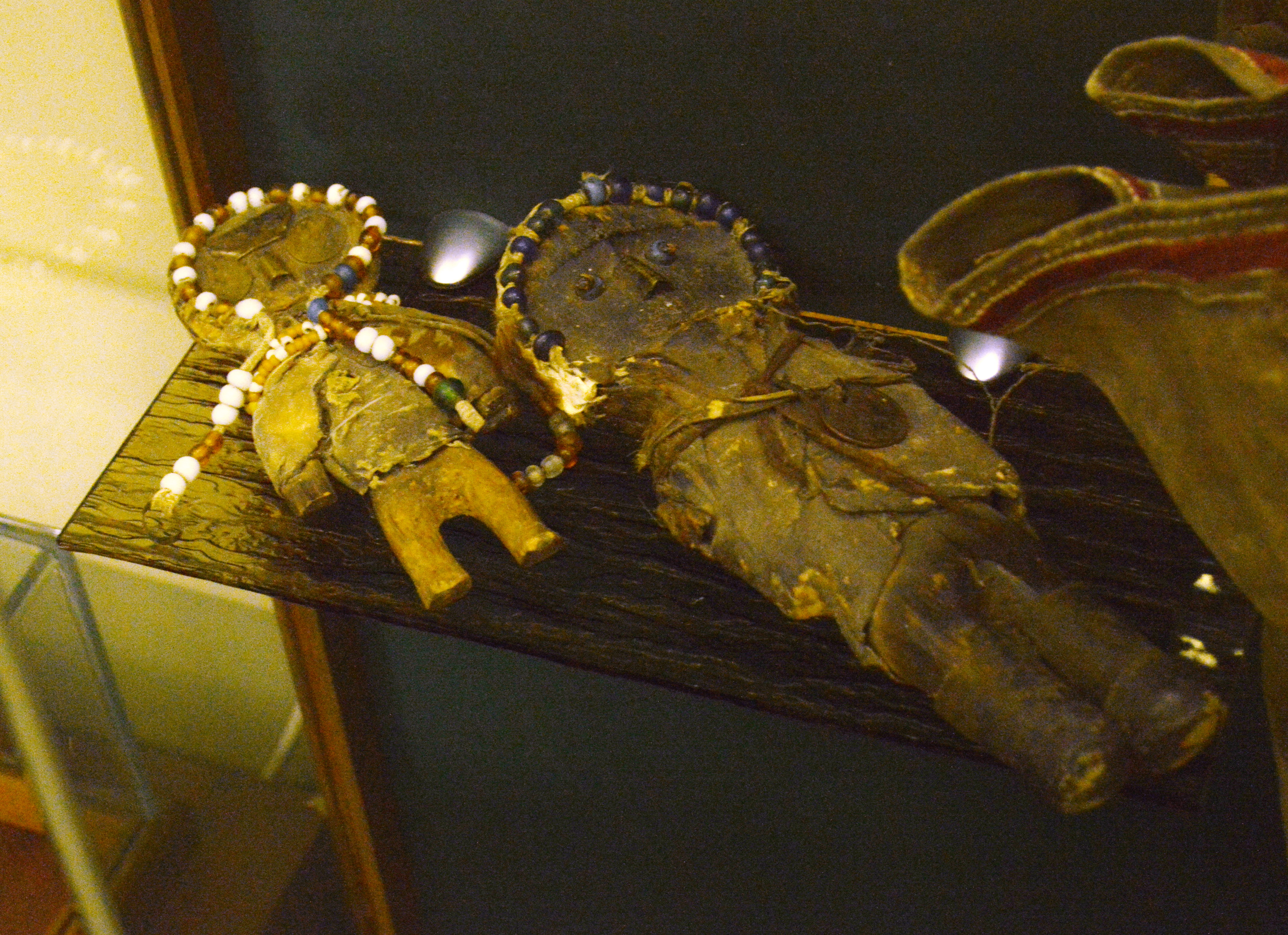
Allal figurines, 18th–19th centuries, Perm Regional Museum

Ket mythology is the mythology of the Kets, which includes legends, fairy tales, data related to shamanic rituals and other religious ideas. The Ket religious and mythological system is a hierarchy in which six levels are distinguished. The connection between the levels is carried out with the help of plots in which characters of different levels participate.

== Levels of Ket religious-mythological framework ==
=== First level ===
The first (highest) level of Ket mythology includes only one mythological character – the upper god Eś (Eş, which is translated into English as 'sky' and 'god' or 'deified sky'). In his image, the Kets personified the sky and the natural phenomena associated with it – thunder (Eş deşij, "Eś screams" – a phrase pronounced during thunder), lightning, clouds and even the northern lights – "the fire of the sky-Eś" (Eş (dә) bok). The sky itself is called "Eś's skin" (Eşt holәt) in Ket language. Many folklore stories indicate that Eś lives in the sky, above the seventh circle of the upper world. Some Kets familiar with the Orthodox religion and Christian rituals tend to identify Eś with the Christian god.

=== Second level ===
The characters of the second level include the personification of the evil principle, the mistress of the underworld Hosedem, who has several parallel names in Ket: Хоşеdæm, Хоşijdæm, Hosejdam, etc. and is translated as "mother of Hosij". Khosedem sends bad weather, troubles and damage, pestilence, as well as death and illness of people, devouring their souls - uļwej. According to some legends, Khosedem lives in the ground, according to others - on a rock on the northern island at the mouth of the Yenisey. There are several versions of her relationship with Eś - according to one, Khosedem was Eś's wife and lived with him in his transparent palace. But one day she betrayed Eś and went to the Moon, for which she was overthrown to the earth by her ex-husband. According to another version, Khosedem herself decided to leave heaven. Tomam (Tomam, Tomæm, "mother of heat") also belongs to this level, and is associated with the south, heat, and the sun. While Khosedem is associated with the north and winter, Tomam is associated with the south and spring.

=== Third level ===
The third level includes the characters-heroes of the epic. Doh and Albe are the first cultural heroes of the Kets, who confront Khosedem. Albe acts as the first person or even a participant in the act of creation of the world, while Doh lived later, as evidenced by the story of his death, separated from the time of the narrator by a gap of 300 years. The three brothers Balne, Belegene and Torete, whose acts of bravery are best attested in the Ket tales, also belong to this level. In addition to these five heroes, other heroes also belong to the third level, in particular, the great shamans of the past: Purtos, whose words are referenced in shamanic songs, and the shaman Vasily Lesovkin, who is at the intersection of historical time and the time of the narrator. He appears in the tragic situation of the clash between the Kets and the non-Kets, leading to the death of the shaman and the end of the tradition of great shamans.

=== Fourth level ===
The fourth level includes spirits – embodiments of earthly nature. This includes earth and water spirits Dotethem, Lyutys, Kai-gus, Ul-gus and others. All these creatures live in forests and rivers and are capable of causing harm to humans, although they do not always actively strive to do so. Another class of this level includes objects that make up the system of human protection and the well-being of his home. Such objects include Alel – a person's assistant in the fight against troubles, illnesses and evil spirits, represented as a wooden figurine of a small man dressed in animal skins. A separate class of this level includes natural objects – animals: first of all, the bear, as well as the loon as a bird of the lower world, the eagle as a bird of the upper world, the swan, the deer, the beaver, the burbot. A special class is represented by celestial objects: the moon, the sun, some stars and constellations. In this case, the Big Dipper and Orion are depicted as animals (like an elk and a deer) and are adjacent to the previous class. Another class within this level is the hostile to the Kets “non-Kets”: Evenks, Yuraks, Russians. The last class of this level consists of characters who may have previously belonged to higher levels, but in the texts of the 20th century appear in fairy-tale time and are sometimes opposed to each other as good and evil beginnings: Hun — the daughter of the sun or the sun itself and Kalbesem.

=== Fifth level ===
The fifth level of Ket mythology is represented by shamans. Shamanism in Ket mythology is associated with the reincarnation of a shaman, explained by the inhabitation of spirits. These spirits themselves can be considered as objects of the fourth level. Shamans can differ in the strength of their shamanic abilities (the difference between great shamans and lesser shamans).

=== Sixth level ===
The main character of the sixth level is the person himself. However, just as a shaman becomes a shaman only after the spirits enter him, a person becomes an object of this level only after the main (seventh) soul enters him – uļwej, which accompanies the person throughout his life.
