= Svetlogorsk =

Svetlogorsk may refer to:

- Svetlogorsk Urban Settlement, several municipal urban settlements in Russia
- Svetlogorsk, Russia, several inhabited localities in Russia
- Svyetlahorsk (Svetlogorsk), a town in Belarus
