= Dynda =

Dynda may refer to:

- Jiří Dynda, Czech researcher in religious studies
- Lake Dynda, Russia
