= Ostyak language =

Two languages were formerly known as Ostyak:

- Khanty language
- Ket language
