= Yermakovo, Krasnoyarsk Krai =

Yermakovo Ермаково
- Urban-type settlement
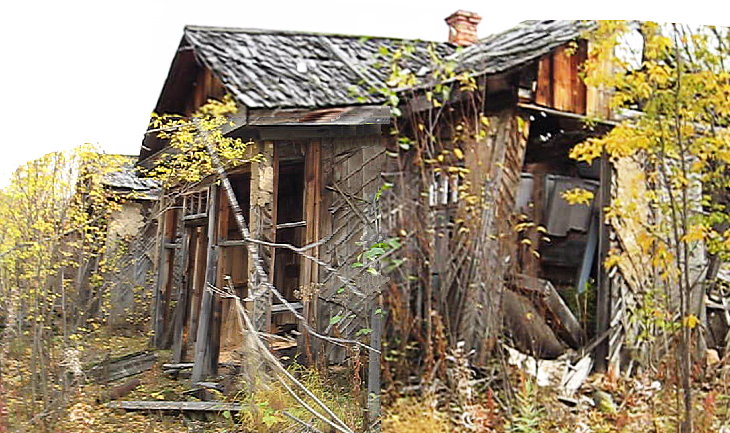
- Here is one of the typical houses with the three "front buildings" in the civil area of the old settlement Yermakovo
- Interactive map of Yermakovo
- Location of Yermakovo Yermakovo (Krasnoyarsk Krai)
- Coordinates: 66°35′N 86°11′E
- Country: Russia
- Federal subject: Krasnoyarsk Krai
- Administrative district: Turukhansky District
- Founded: 1949

Population (2010 Census)
  - Total: 12
  - Estimate (1926): 8 (−33.3%)

Yermakovo (Russian: Ермако́во) is an abandoned urban-type settlement in Krasnoyarsk krai near the town of Igarka in Siberia. It was built in 1949 as a Gulag labor camp to house the prisoners constructing the Salekhard–Igarka Railway. It also housed the administrative center of the construction. By 1955 it was abandoned. It was revitalised in the 2000s as a tourist town. The population in 2011 was 12. The main attraction for the town is a Gulag museum.
