= Skewbald Horde =

Former proto-state in central Siberia

The Skewbald Horde (Russian: Пегая Орда, romanized: Pegaya Orda) was a Selkup and Ket tribal association in the basins of the Narym and Tom Rivers during the 16th century. It was an ally and eastern neighbor of the Khanate of Sibir.

At the end of the 16th century the Skewbald Horde was led by Vonya, a prince of the upper Narym. Territory along the lower Narym fell under the authority of Prince Kichey who was related to Vonya: his granddaughter was married to Vonya's son, Taybokhta.

These princes not only long and stubbornly defended their independence from Moscow and evaded the payment of yasak, but were inclined to go on an offensive. They even entered into relations with Küçüm Khan of Sibir for joint action.

Only with the construction of Narym Ostrog in the 1590s was the Skewbald Horde subdued by Russia. With the submission of the princely families, who dominated the horde up to this point, it did not immediately lose its value. Vonya was succeeded by his son, Taybokhta Vonin, and Kichey by his son Vagay Kicheev, the father-in-law of Taybokhta. They to a certain extent retained their privileged position. In the event of war their troops served together with Russian servicemen.

Soon the Narym princes chose to change their position of ephemeral sovereigns for a more secure position in the Tsar's service. In 1610, Taybokhta Vonin, on his request, was relieved of yasak, and ordered to serve the sovereign and live in Narym ostrog with an annual salary of 3 rubles, 4 chetveriks of flour, a chetverik of each groats and kama, and a pood of salt. He, however, continued to remain at the head of the upper Narym principality with a population of around 50 yasak-paying people, and his son had to pay yasak.

Similarly, the descendants of Kichey began shifting to the role of public service. In the 1620s and 1630s, Vagay continued to be prince of the lower Narym principality, but his brother was baptized, and under the name of Grigoriy Kicheev was in the service in the Narym garrison with a salary of 8 rubles, 8 chetveriks of flour, 2 chetveriks of groats and 2 poods of salt per year. His cousins, Ivan Boyarko and Olosha Olontayko (Aleksey Alatay) Sanbycheev, also baptized, were enrolled under the same conditions. During the life of Grigoriy Kicheev, his son Aleksey entered the service.

The same fate apparently befell some of the Parabel princes: Kirsha Kunyazev with his brothers and children served in "all kinds of state service", but was not released from yasak and completely ruined. He pledged his wife and children, and only by a special decree by Tsar Vasily IV he was given exemption from yasak, and his family was bought back by the treasury. His son Kanna stood at the head of one of the four municipalities of Parabel in 1626–1629. At the same time, a member of the family of newly baptized princes, Prince Pyotr Parabelsky served in Surgut among the rank-and-file soldiers and Cossacks.
