= Svetlogorsk, Russia =

Svetlogorsk (Russian: Светлогорск) is the name of several inhabited localities in Russia.

Urban localities

- Svetlogorsk, Kaliningrad Oblast, a town in Svetlogorsky District of Kaliningrad Oblast

Rural localities

- Svetlogorsk, Chelyabinsk Oblast, a settlement in Svetlogorsky Selsoviet of Agapovsky District in Chelyabinsk Oblast
- Svetlogorsk, Krasnoyarsk Krai, a settlement in Svetlogorsky Selsoviet of Turukhansky District in Krasnoyarsk Krai
- Svetlogorsk, Nizhny Novgorod Oblast, a settlement in Svetlogorsky Selsoviet of Shatkovsky District in Nizhny Novgorod Oblast
