= Svetlogorsky =

Svetlogorsky (masculine), Svetlogorskaya (feminine), or Svetlogorskoye (neuter) may refer to:

- Svetlogorsky District, a district of Kaliningrad Oblast, Russia
- Svetlogorskoye Urban Settlement, a municipal formation which the town of district significance of Svetlogorsk in Svetlogorsky District of Kaliningrad Oblast, Russia is incorporated as
- Svetlogorsky (inhabited locality) (Svetlogorskaya, Svetlogorskoye), several rural localities in Russia
- Svietlahorsk Rajon (Svetlogorsky District), a district of Gomel Oblast, Belarus
