= Surgutikha =

Surgutikha Сургутиха
- Village
- Interactive map of Surgutikha
- Location of Surgutikha Surgutikha (Krasnoyarsk Krai)
- Coordinates: 63°51′N 87°20′E
- Country: Russia
- Federal subject: Krasnoyarsk Krai
- Administrative district: Turukhansky District

Population (2010 Census)
  - Total: 306
  - Estimate (2010): 167 (−45.4%)

Municipal status
  - Municipal district: Turukhansk Mun. Dist. Inter-Settlement Territory
- Time zone: UTC+7 (MSK+4)
- Postal code: 663243
- OKTMO ID: 04654701972

Surgutikha is a rural locality in Turukhansky District of Krasnoyarsk Krai, Russia, located along the Surgutikha river.

== Population ==
Surgutikha is one of the few remaining localities natively inhabited by the Ket people. The variety of Ket spoken in Surgutikha is Central Ket, today only shared with the nearby villages of Vereshchagino and Baklanikha, although the dialect was historically centered around the now-uninhabited locality of Pakulikha.

In 2014, the village numbered 151 inhabitants, including 42 Ket people (27.8%). This sharp decrease from the 1991 count (299 inhabitants, including 91 Ket people) reflects a pattern of population concentration towards the district's major population centers. 7.2% of the village's population is fluent in Ket, with 33.3% more reporting a partial command of the language.
