= Alexander Kotusov =

Russian-Ket singer (1955–2019)

Alexander Kotusov Александр Котусов
- Born: 1955; Kellog, Russian SFSR, Soviet Union
- Died: 12 July 2019 (aged 63–64)
- Genres: Folk
- Occupations: Singer, composer, songwriter, hunter and fisherman
- Instrument: Vocals

Alexander Maksimovich Kotusov (Russian: Александр Максимович Котусов; 1955 – 12 July, 2019) was a Ket singer, composer and writer of songs in the Ket language. He was also a hunter and fisherman.

His tomb is in his native Kellog, a small village by the Yeloguy River, a tributary of the Yenisei.

== Biography ==
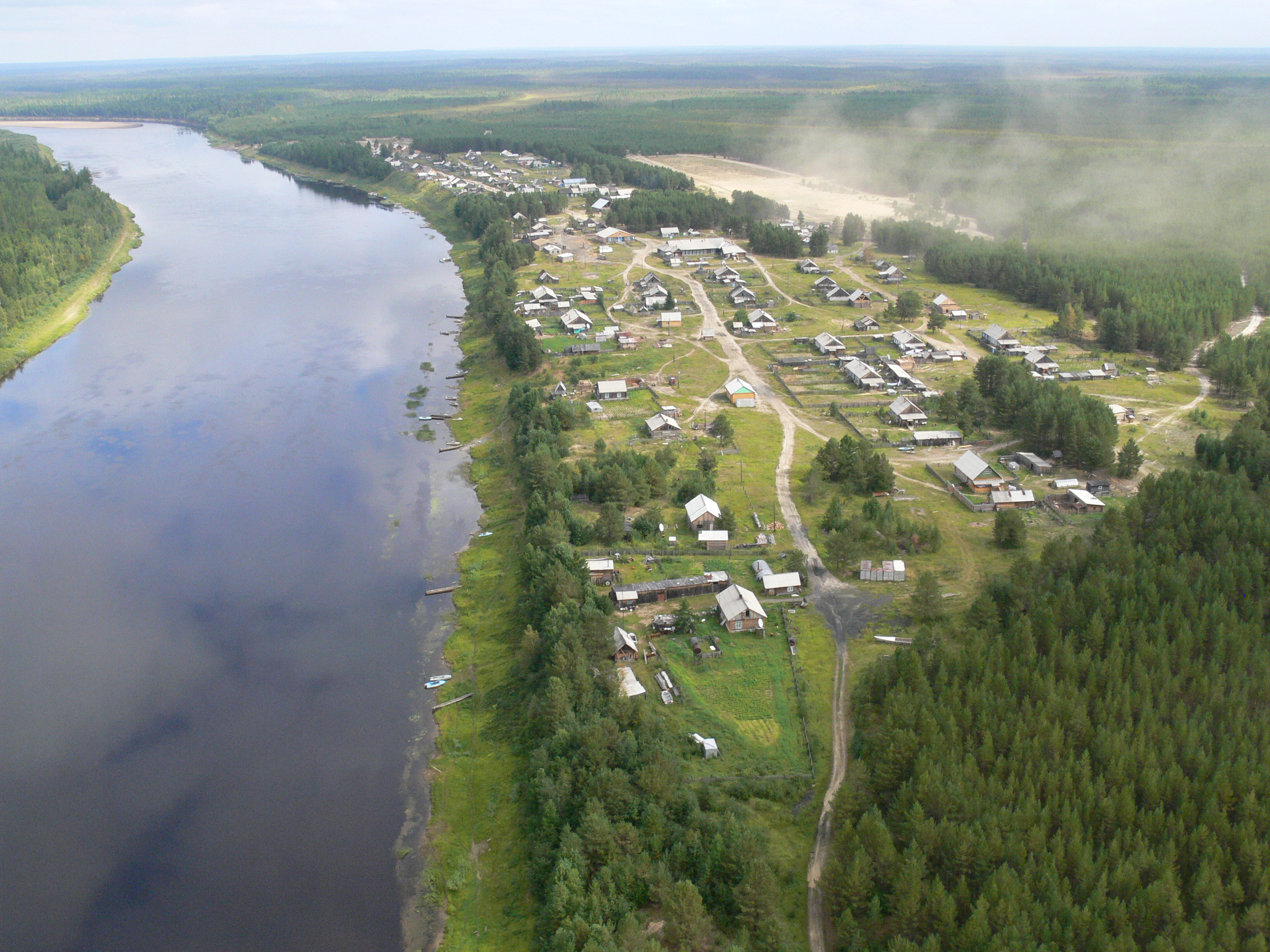
Kellog, the primary Ket village, 2008

Kotusov was born in Kellog of mixed Evenk and Ket descent. His father was an Evenk hunter and shaman who knew the Ket language well and his mother was a Ket. His mother inspired in him the love of poetry and songs. His sister Marya Irikova (born 1953) is also a native speaker of the Ket language and an authority on the Ket oral tradition. The Kotusov family plot was in the Lake Dynda area, about 40 kilometers (25 mi) NW of Kellog.

The breakdown of the shamanistic and nomadic Ket way of life brought about a degradation of the traditional moral values. Alexander Kotusov was imprisoned twice. He managed however, to thwart the descent into heavy drinking and alcoholism, which plagued Ket society.

=== Musical career ===
Owing to his mother's influence Kotusov was a singer all his life. His repertoire included Ket folk and ritual songs, as well as contemporary-style songs. The latter included translations into Ket of famous Russian songs such as popular hits of Alla Pugacheva, Natali, Valery Leontiev, Tatiana Bulanova and Sofia Rotaru, among others. He also adapted to the Ket language Jewish and Russian folk songs, as well as "criminals' songs".

The lyrics of his songs were mainly inspired by his native land, the village of Kellog where he had lived all his life, nearby flowing river Yeloguy, as well as Lake Dynda. Kotusov recorded the songs in 2005 and they were decrypted in 2009 with his help. Kotusov also helped with the translation of texts written by Olga Latikova (1917–2007), an authority on Ket folklore from Sulomai village, Evenky District.

=== Illness and death ===
Kotusov fell ill in the summer 2018. Owing to the remoteness of his village he sought medical assistance when it was already too late. A few months later Kotusov ended up in a Krasnoyarsk hospital under cancer treatment, but doctors discharged him without providing adequate medical care. When political activist Yulia Galyamina and anthropologist Nikita Petrov learned about the situation they helped to raise 45,000 rubles among Moscow linguists. The funds were necessary not only for Kotusov's continued treatment but also to charter a helicopter to send him to the hospital from Kellog.

Kotusov died on 12 July 2019 in the morning in the Turukhansk hospital. His body was brought to Kellog for burial. Following his death only about 10 to 20 people remain who are fluent in the Ket language.
