= Ket people =

Ethnic group in Siberia

Kets кето, кет, денг
kə́nadeŋ
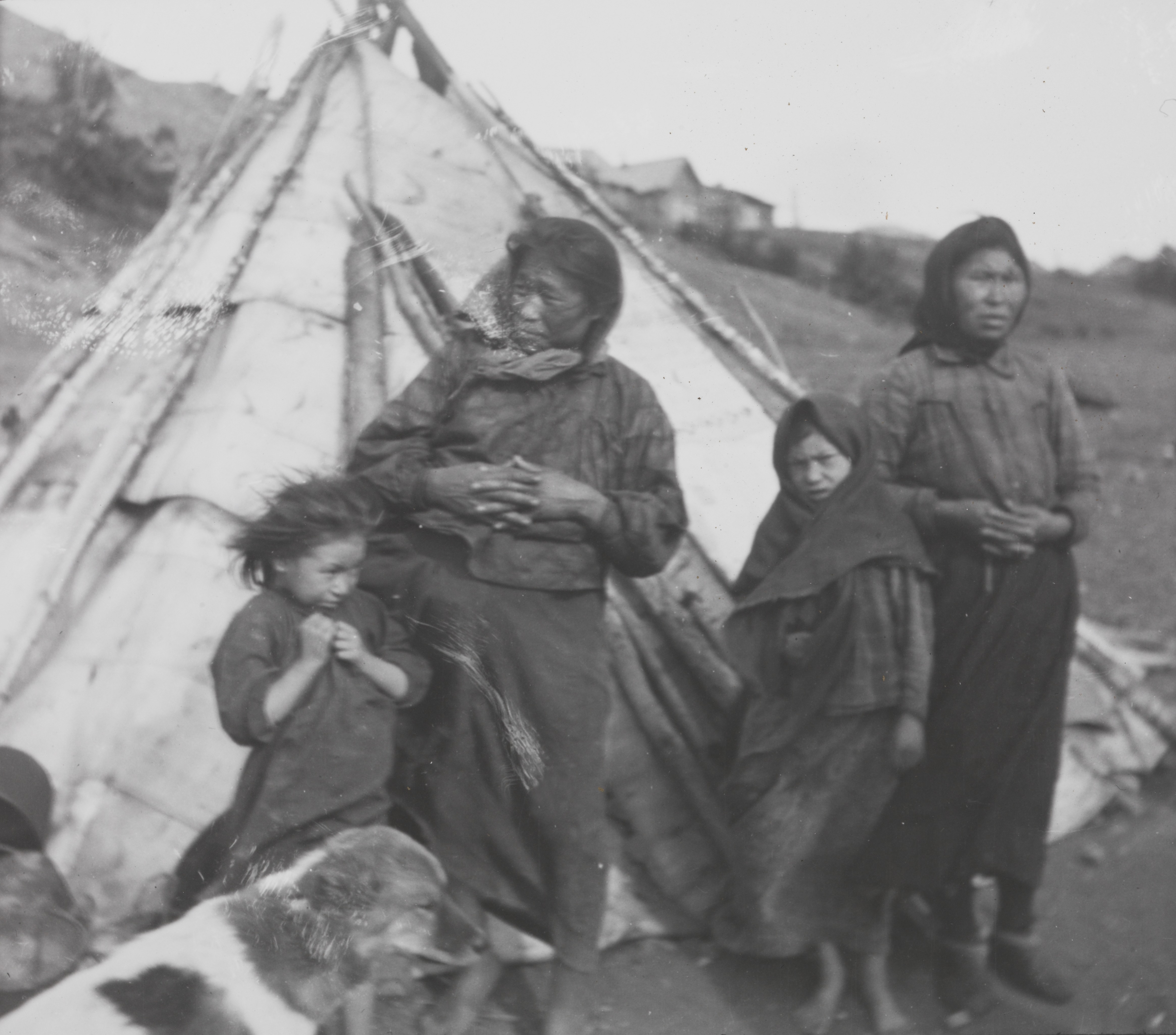
- Kets

Total population
- c. 1,100

Regions with significant populations
- Krasnoyarsk Krai (Russia)
- Russia: 1,088 (2021)
- Ukraine: 37 (2001)

Languages
- Ket, Russian

Religion
- Russian Orthodoxy, Animism, Shamanism

Related ethnic groups
- Yughs, Paleo-Eskimos, Indigenous peoples of the Americas, especially Na-Dene peoples, Selkups, Siberian Tatars

Location of Ket people
- Location within Russia
- 62°29′N 86°16′E
- Location: Most Ket live on the middle Yenisei River and tributaries, including a group in the community of Kellog.

Kets (Russian: кеты; Ket: кето, кет, денг) are a Yeniseian-speaking people in Siberia. During the Russian Empire, they were known as Ostyaks, without differentiating them from several other Siberian people. Later, they became known as Yenisei Ostyaks because they lived in the middle and lower basin of the Yenisei River in the Krasnoyarsk Krai district of Russia. The modern Kets lived along the eastern middle stretch of the river before being assimilated politically into Russia between the 17th and 19th centuries. According to the 2010 census, there were 1,220 Kets in Russia. According to the 2021 census, this number had declined to 1,088.

== Origin ==
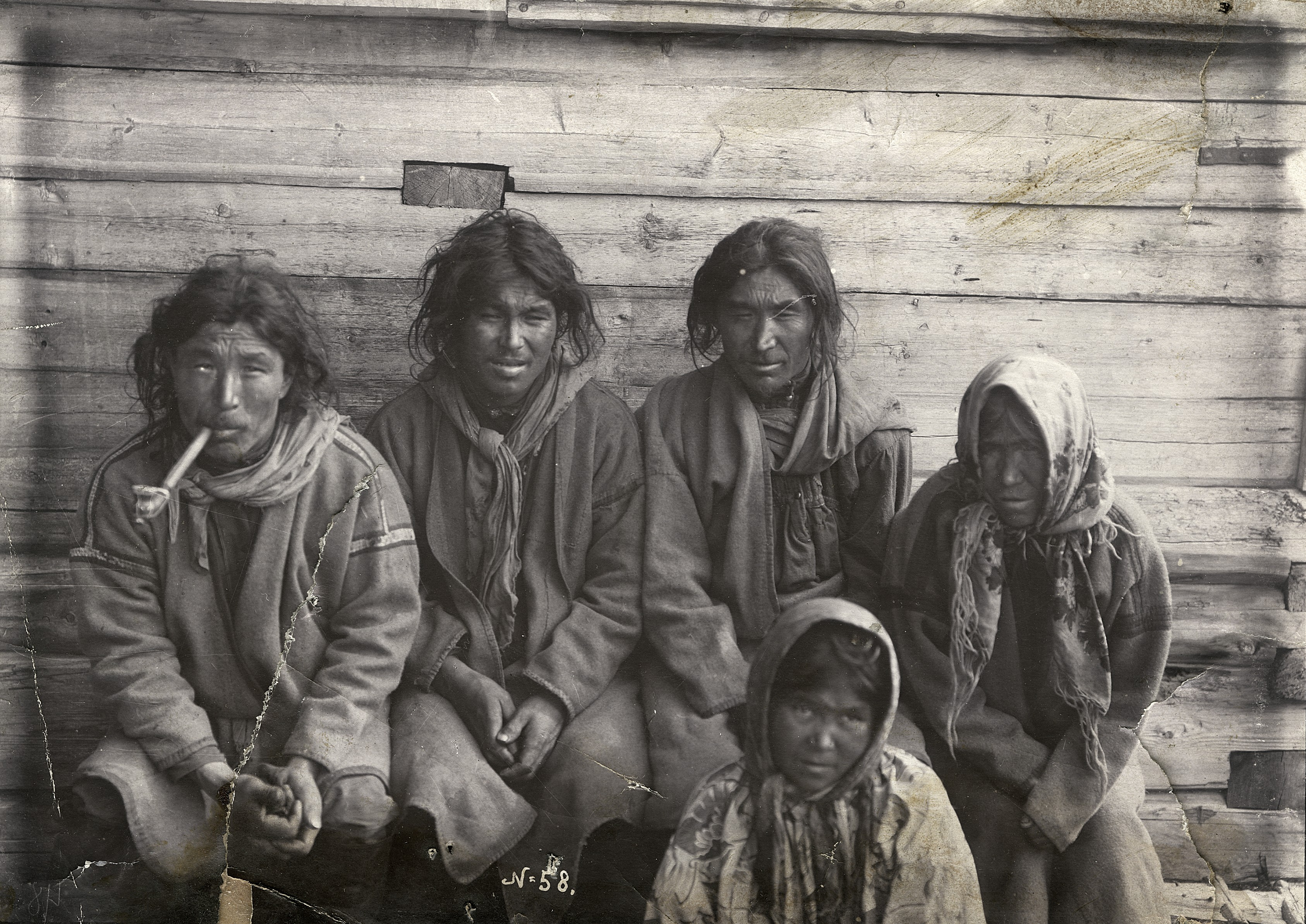
Ket family, around 1900.

The Ket people share their origin with other Yeniseian people and are closely related to other Indigenous people of Siberia and Indigenous peoples of the Americas. They belong mostly to Y-DNA haplogroup Q-M242.

According to a 2016 study, the Ket and other Yeniseian people originated likely somewhere near the Altai Mountains or near Lake Baikal. It is suggested that parts of the Altaians are predominantly of Yeniseian origin and closely related to the Ket people. The Ket people are also closely related to several Native American groups. According to this study, the Yeniseians are linked to the Paleo-Eskimo groups.

== Genetics ==
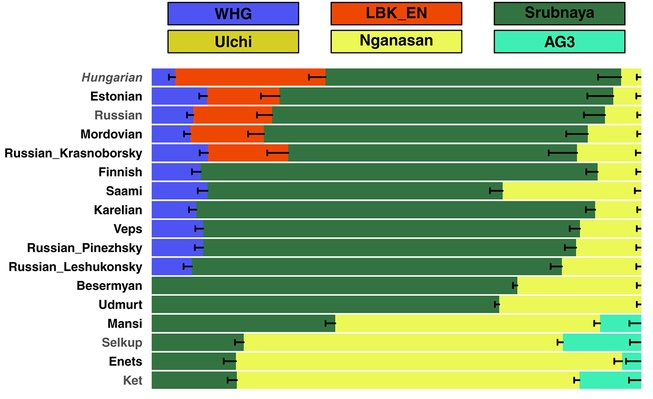
Estimated ancestry components among selected Eurasian populations. The yellow component represents Neo-Siberian ancestry (represented by Nganasans).

According to one study, the vast majority of Kets belong to Y-DNA haplogroup Q-L330 (94%). According to other DNA research, most Kets belong to three unrelated haplogroups, 86.4% of whom to Q, 9.1% to haplogroup N1a1 and 4.5% to haplogroup R1a.

A 2016 study found that the global maximum of ANE ancestry occurs in modern-day Native Americans and Kets, with lower levels in peoples of more recent Beringian origin (indigenous populations of Chukotka, Kamchatka, the Aleutian Islands and the American Arctic).

The 'Ket' component is found at high levels (up to ~20%) in four Turkic-speaking populations of the Altai region: Shors, Khakases, Altaians, and Teleuts. The Altai region was populated by Yeniseian-speaking peoples, before they were pushed north. The 'Ket' component is at lower levels (from 5%-15%) observed in the following geographic regions (in decreasing order): the Volga-Ural region, Central Asia, South Asia, East Siberia and Mongolia, and North Caucasus.

== Geographic distribution ==
Ket people distribution in Siberian Federal District

Ket people live primarily in Turukhansky district of Krasnoyarsk Krai.

Kets by selected settlements as of 2010:

Name	Total population	Ket population	Percentage of Ket population
Sulomai	183	147	80.33%
Kellog	306	216	70.59%
Turukhansk	4,662	105	2.25%
Maduyka	79	65	82.28%
Bor	2,635	65	2.47%
Sym	140	17	12.14%
Yartsevo	1700	10	1.12%
Verkhneimbatsk	614	31	5.05%
Surgutikha	199	53	26.63%
Vereshchagino	203	32	15.76%
Baklanikha	48	20	41.67%
Farkovo	327	19	5.81%
Goroshikha	123	39	31.71%

== History ==
The Kets are thought to be the only survivors of an ancient nomadic people believed to have originally inhabited central and southern Siberia. In the 1960s, the Yugh people were distinguished as a separate, though similar, group.

Today, Kets are the descendants of fishermen and hunter tribes of the Yenisei taiga, who adopted some of the cultural ways of those original Ket-speaking tribes of South Siberia. The earlier tribes engaged in hunting, fishing, and reindeer breeding in the northern areas.

Some of the Ket were part of the Skewbald Horde prior to the arrival of the Russians. The Ket were incorporated into the Russian state in the 17th century. Their efforts to resist were unsuccessful as the Russians deported them to different places in an attempt to break up their resistance. This broke up their strictly organized patriarchal social system and their way of life disintegrated. The Ket people ran up debts with the Russians. Some died of famine, others of diseases introduced from Europe. By the 19th century, the Ket could no longer sustain themselves without food assistance from the Russian state.

In the 20th century, the Soviets conducted collectivization among the Ket. They were officially recognized as Kets in the 1930s when the Soviet Union began to implement the self-definition policy for indigenous peoples. However, many Ket traditions continued to be counteracted by the state. Collectivization was completed by the 1950s, and the Ket people were led to adopt the same lifestyle as ethnic Russians; education in Russian contributed to language loss as well.

The population of Kets has been relatively stable since 1923. According to the 2010 census, there were 1,220 Kets in Russia. The Kets live in small villages along riversides and are no longer nomadic. Unemployment and alcoholism are rampant among the Ket, like many other indigenous peoples of Siberia.

== Language ==
The Ket language has been linked to the Na-Dené languages of North America in the Dené–Yeniseian language family. This link has led to some collaboration between the Ket and northern Athabaskan peoples. Although a potential link to the Na-Dené languages has been identified, this link is not accepted by all linguists.

Ket means "man" (plural deng "men, people"). The Kets of the Kas, Sym and Dubches rivers use jugun as a self-designation. In 1788, Peter Simon Pallas was the earliest scholar to publish observations about the Ket language in a travel diary. An older ethnonym, kə́nadeŋ, is used by the older generation.

In 1926, there were 1,428 Kets, of whom 1,225 (85.8%) were native speakers of the Ket language. The 1989 census counted 1,113 ethnic Kets with only 537 (48.3%) native speakers left.

As of 2008, there were only about 100 people who still spoke Ket fluently, half of them over 50. It is entirely different from any other language in Siberia. Alexander Kotusov (1955–2019) was a Ket folk singer, composer, and writer of songs in the Ket language.

== Culture ==
Map of the Yeniseian peoples with Ket being the northernmost group

The Kets have a rich and varied culture, filled with an abundance of Siberian mythology, including shamanistic practices and oral traditions. Siberia, the area of Russia in which the Kets reside, has long been identified as the originating place of the Shaman or Shamanism. In the 1950s, Mircea Eliade states this in the first sentence of his book Shamanism: "Since the beginning of the 20th century, ethnologists have fallen into the habit of using the terms 'shaman', 'medicine man', 'sorcerer', and 'magician' interchangeably to designate certain individuals possessing magico-religious powers and found in all 'primitive' societies. If the word 'shaman' is taken to mean any magician, sorcerer, medicine man, or ecstatic found throughout the history of religion and religious ethnology, we arrive at a notion at once extremely complex and extremely vague; it seems, furthermore, to serve no purpose, for we already have the terms 'magician' or 'sorcerer' to express notions as unlike and ill-defined as 'primitive magic' or 'primitive mysticism'."

The shamans of the Ket people have been identified as practitioners of healing as well as other local ritualistic spiritual practices. Supposedly, there were several types of Ket shamans, differing in function (sacral rites, curing), power, and associated animals (deer, bear). Also, among Kets, (as with several other Siberian peoples such as the Karagas) there are examples of the use of skeleton symbolics. Hoppál interprets it as a symbol of shamanic rebirth, although it may also symbolize the bones of the loon (the helper animal of the shaman, joining the air and underwater worlds, just like the story of the shaman who traveled both to the sky and the underworld). The skeleton-like overlay represented shamanic rebirth among some other Siberian cultures as well.

Today, the practice of shamanism has largely been abandoned. Monotheism has displaced the ideas of the shaman and shamanistic practices. Of great importance to Kets are spirit images, described as "an animal shoulder bone wrapped in a scrap of cloth simulating clothing." One adult Ket, who had been careless with a cigarette, said, "It's a shame I don't have my doll. My house burnt down together with my dolls." Kets regard their spirit images as household deities, which sleep in the daytime and protect them at night.

Edward J. Vajda, a professor of Modern and Classical languages, spent a year in Siberia studying the Ket people, and found a possible relationship between the Ket language and the Na-Dene languages, of which Navajo is the most prominent and widely spoken.

Vyacheslav Ivanov and Vladimir Toporov compared Ket mythology with those of speakers of Uralic languages, assuming in the studies that they are modeling semiotic systems in the compared mythologies. They have also made typological comparisons. Among other comparisons, possibly from Uralic mythological analogies, the mythologies of Ob-Ugric peoples and Samoyedic peoples are mentioned. Other authors have discussed analogies (similar folklore motifs, purely typological considerations, and certain binary pairs in symbolics) may be related to a dualistic organization of society – some dualistic features can be found in comparisons with these peoples. However, for Kets, neither dualistic organization of society nor cosmological dualism have been researched thoroughly. If such features existed at all, they have either weakened or remained largely undiscovered. There are some reports of a division into two exogamous patrilinear moieties, folklore on conflicts of mythological figures, and cooperation of two beings in the creation of the land, the motif of the earth-diver. This motif is present in several cultures in different variants. In one example, the creator of the world is helped by a waterfowl as the bird dives under the water and fetches earth so that the creator can make land out of it. In some cultures, the creator and the earth-fetching being (sometimes called a devil, or taking the shape of a loon) compete with one another; in other cultures (including the Ket variant), they do not compete at all, but rather collaborate.

However, if dualistic cosmologies are defined in a broad sense, and not restricted to certain concrete motifs, then their existence is more widespread; they exist not only among some Uralic-speaking peoples, but in examples on every inhabited continent.

The Ket traditional culture has been researched extensively. Some people included as reference are Matthias Castrén, Vasiliy Ivanovich Anuchin, Kai Donner, Hans Findeisen, and Yevgeniya Alekseyevna Alekseyenko.

1913 photographs by the Norwegian explorer Fridtjof Nansen:

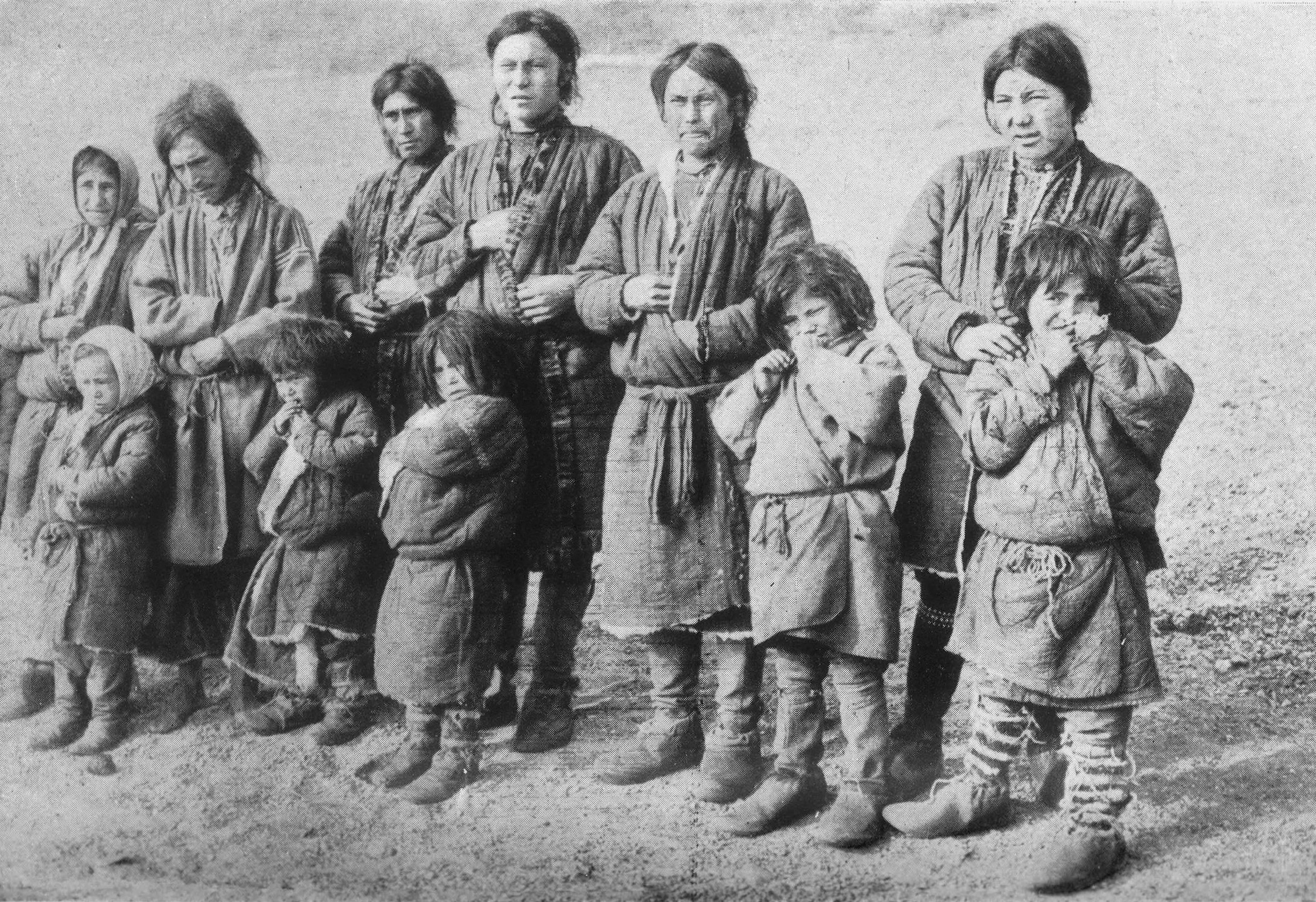

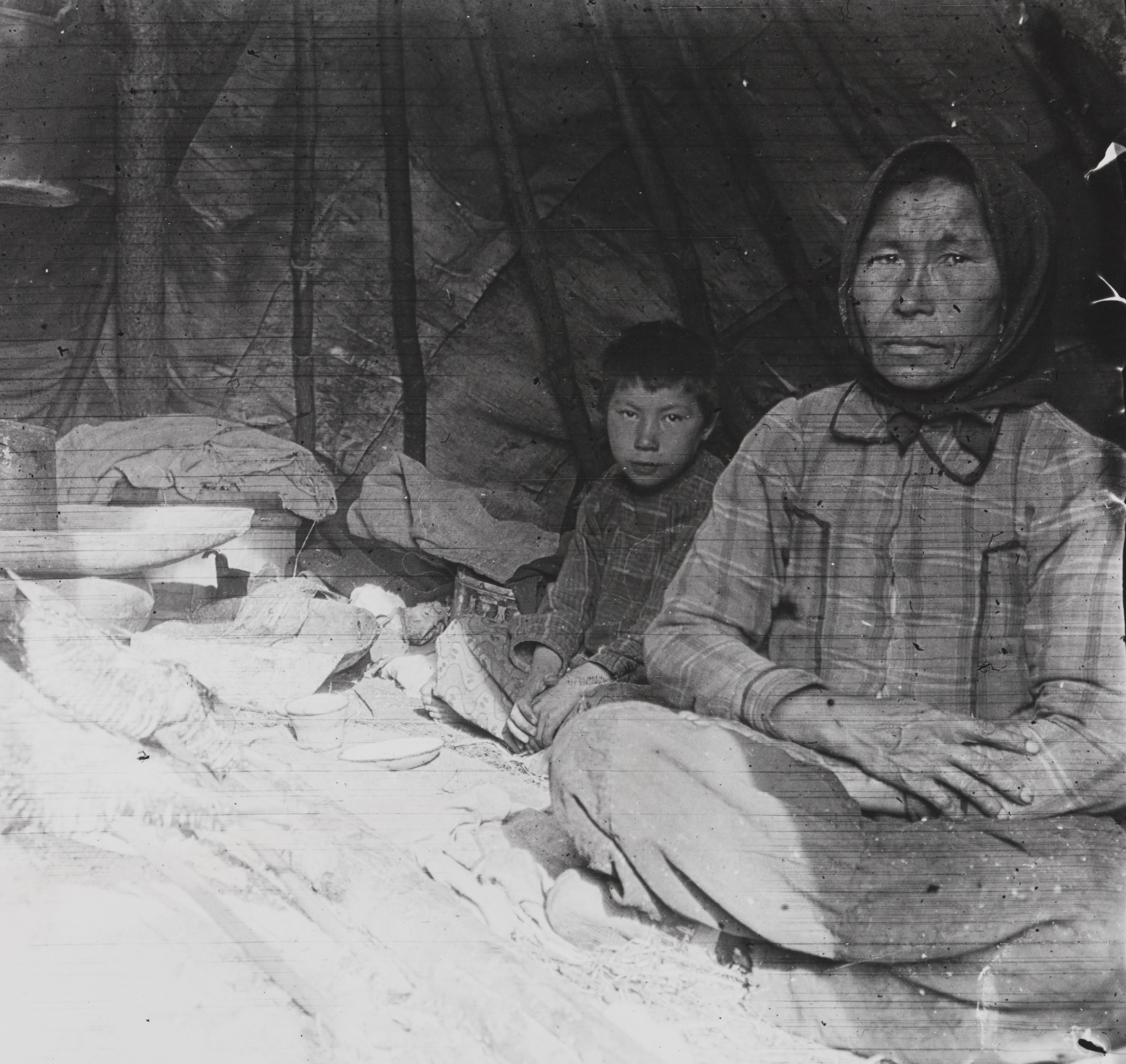

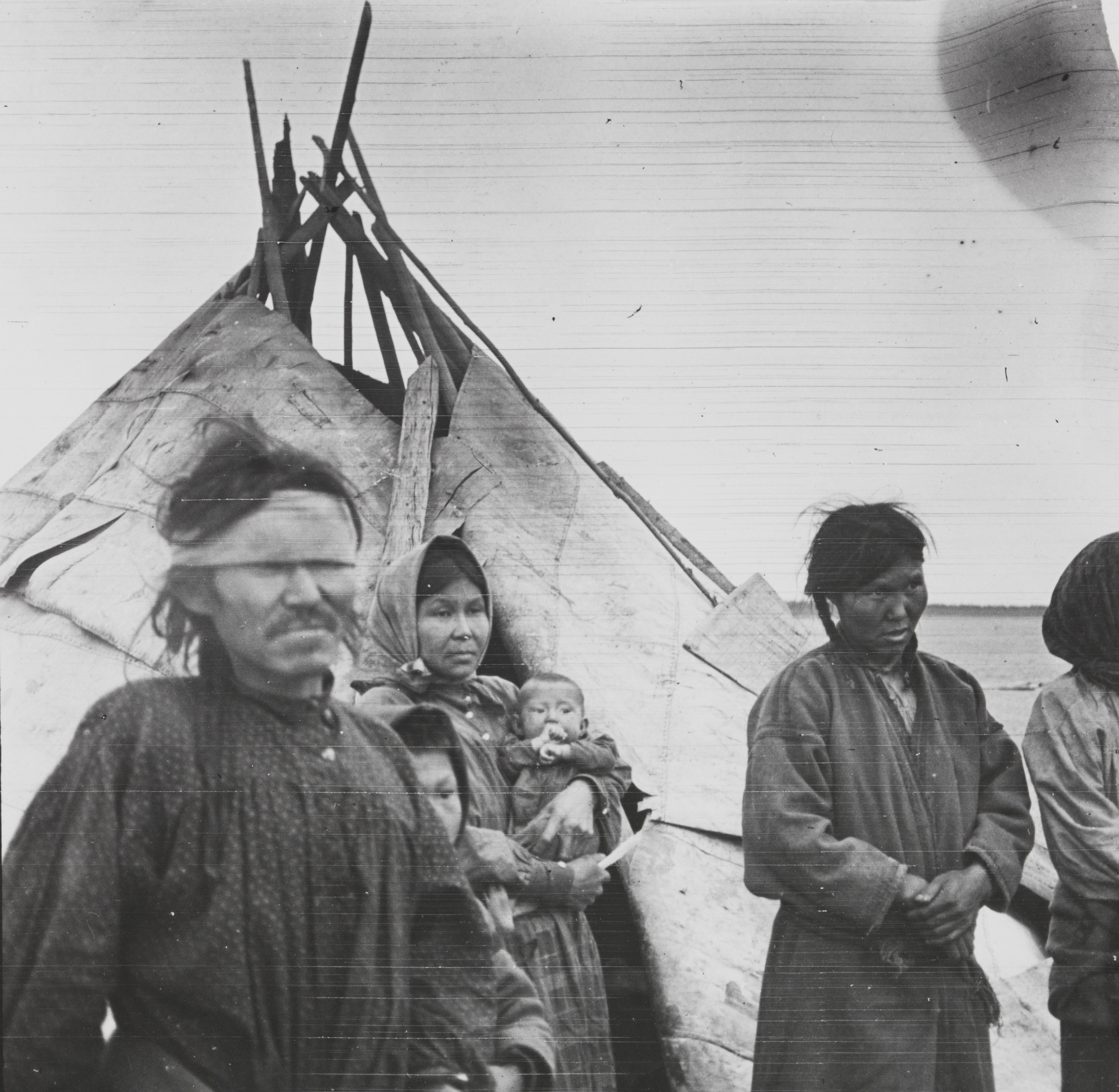

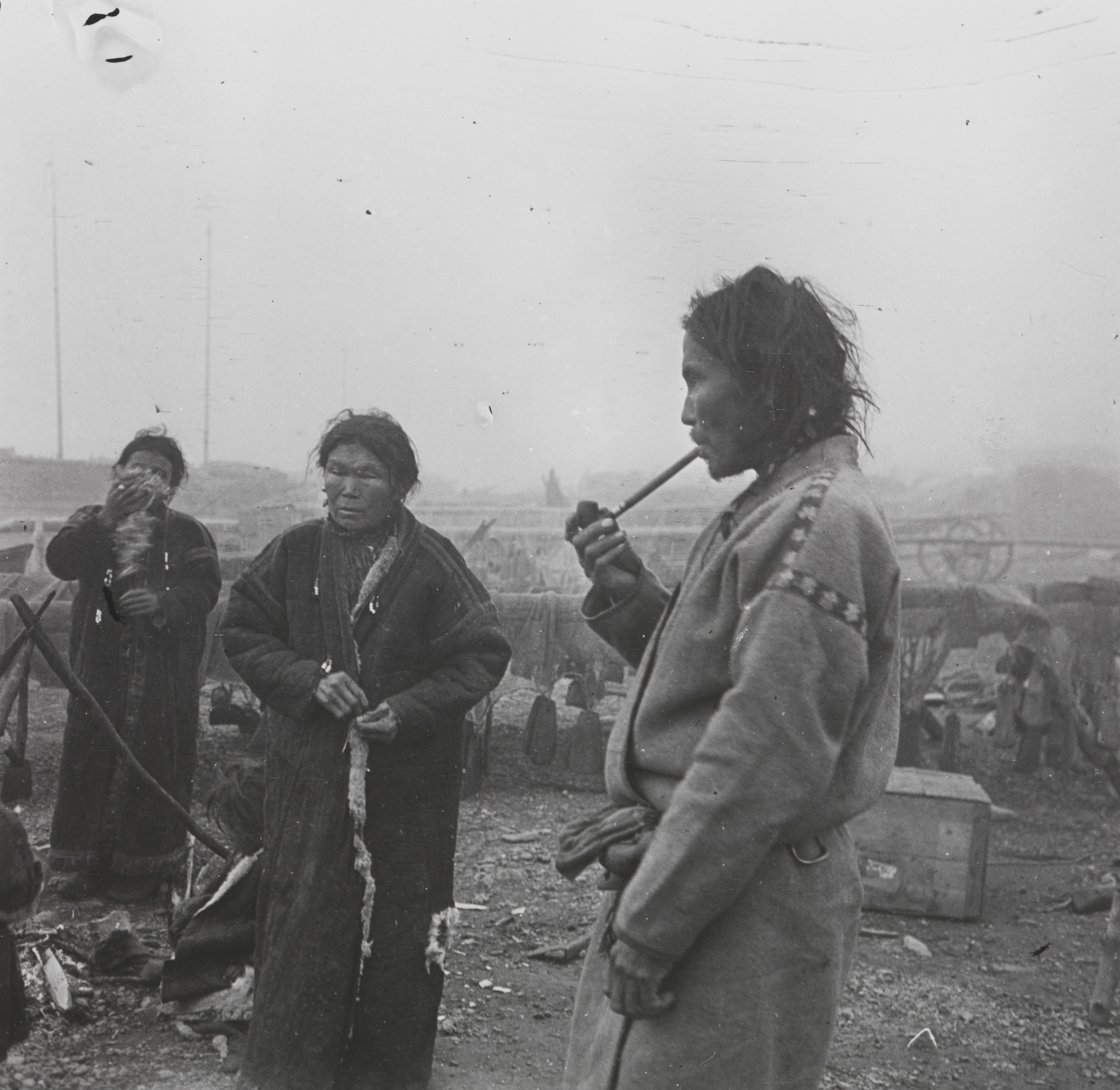

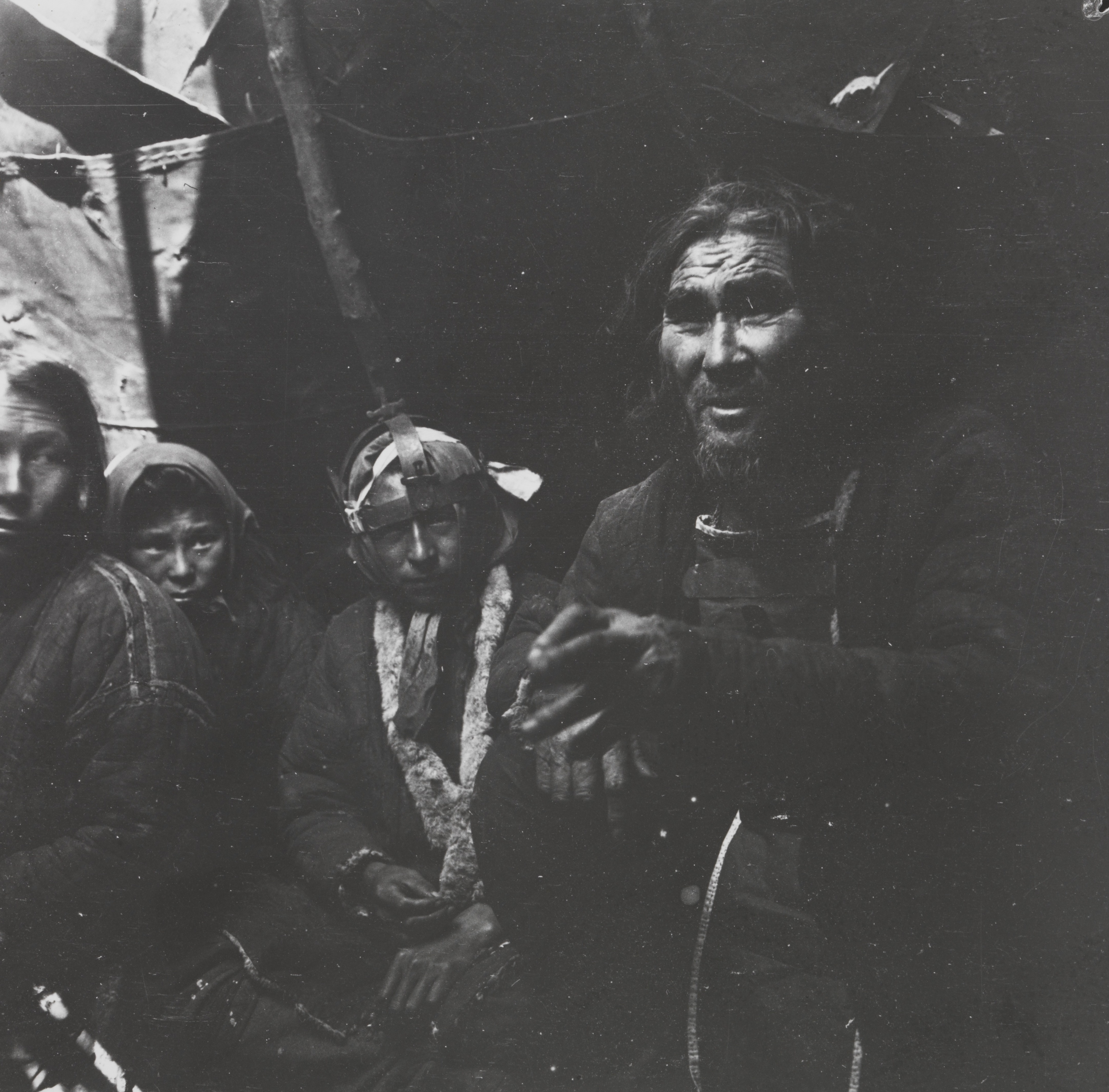

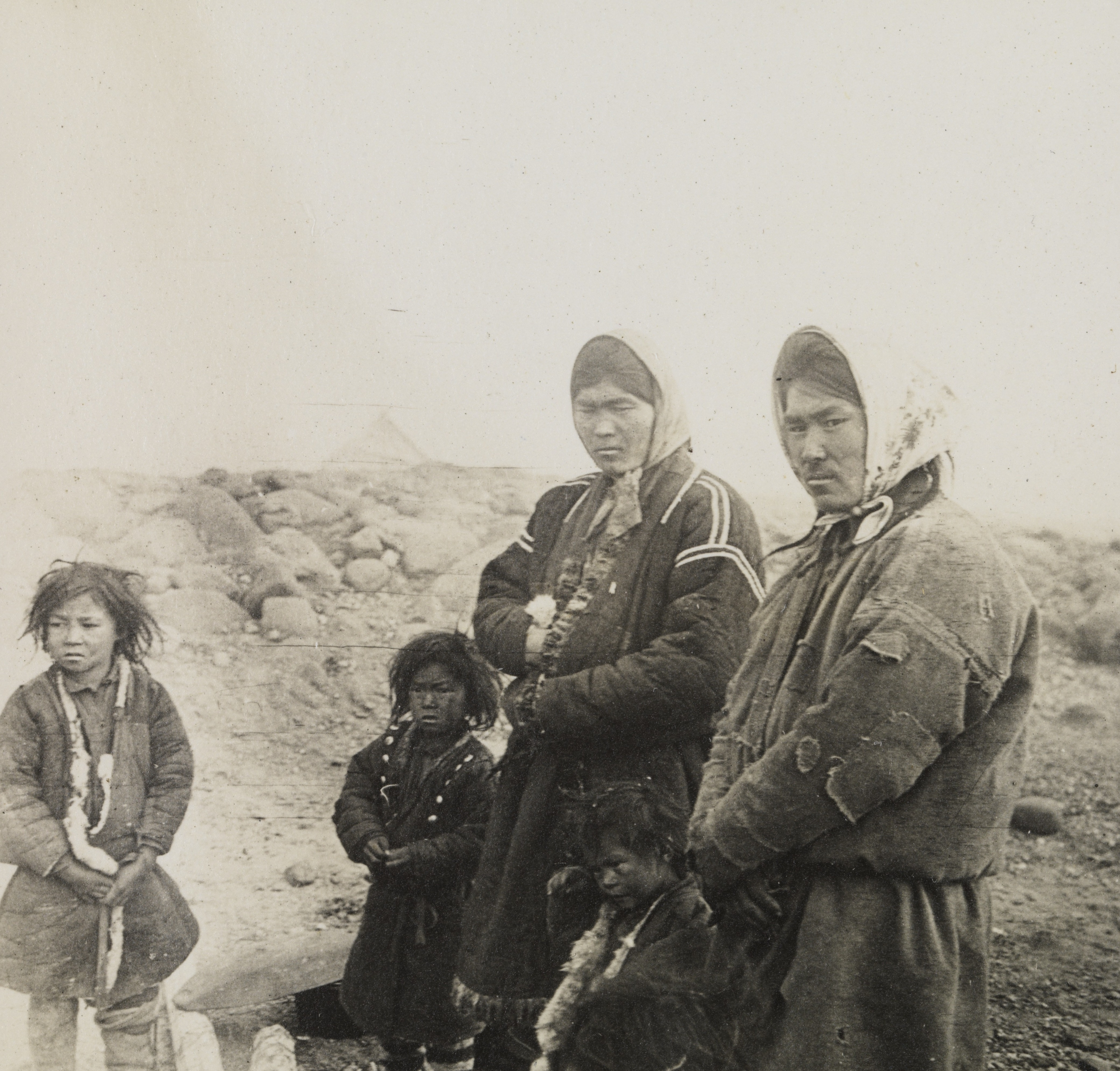

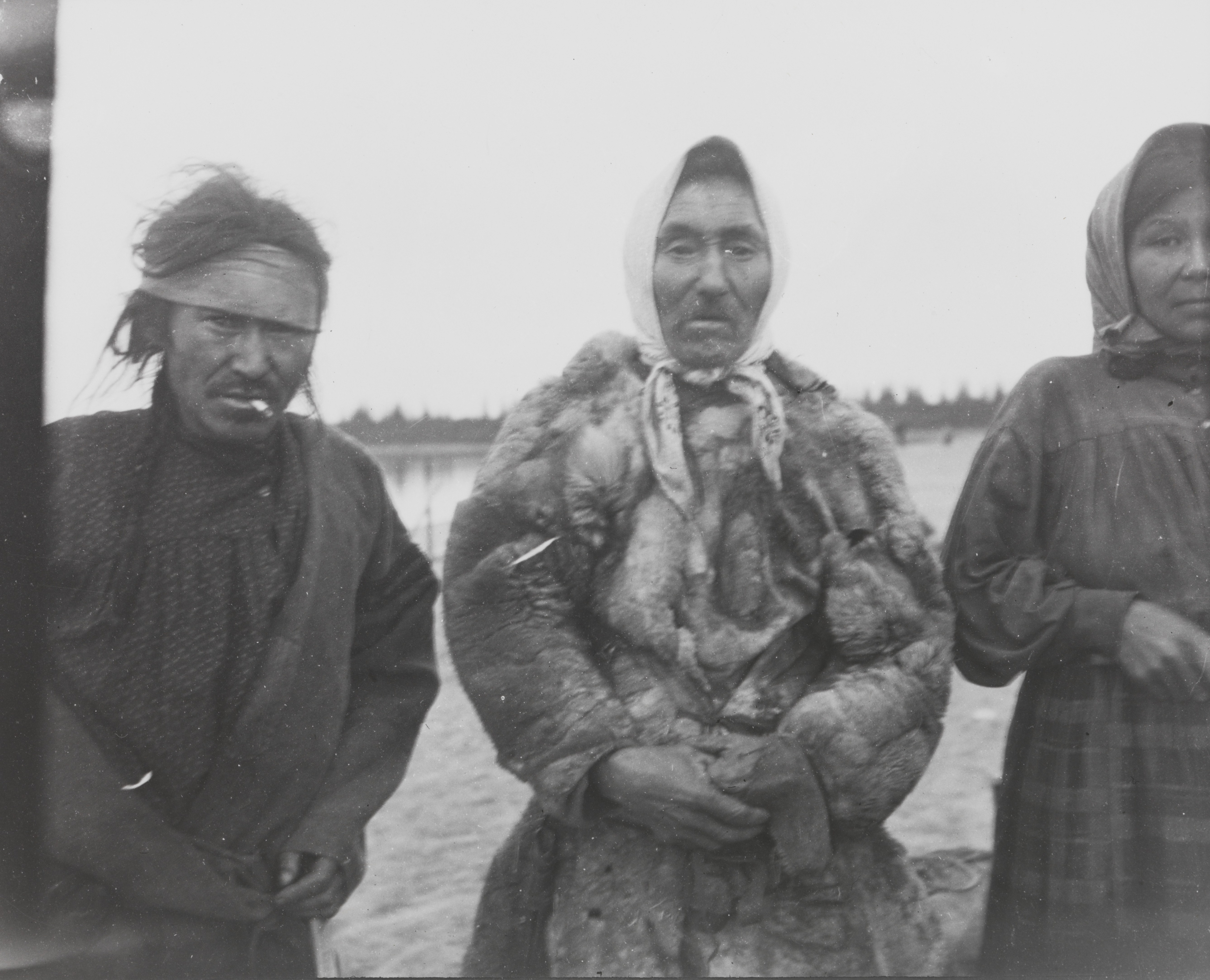

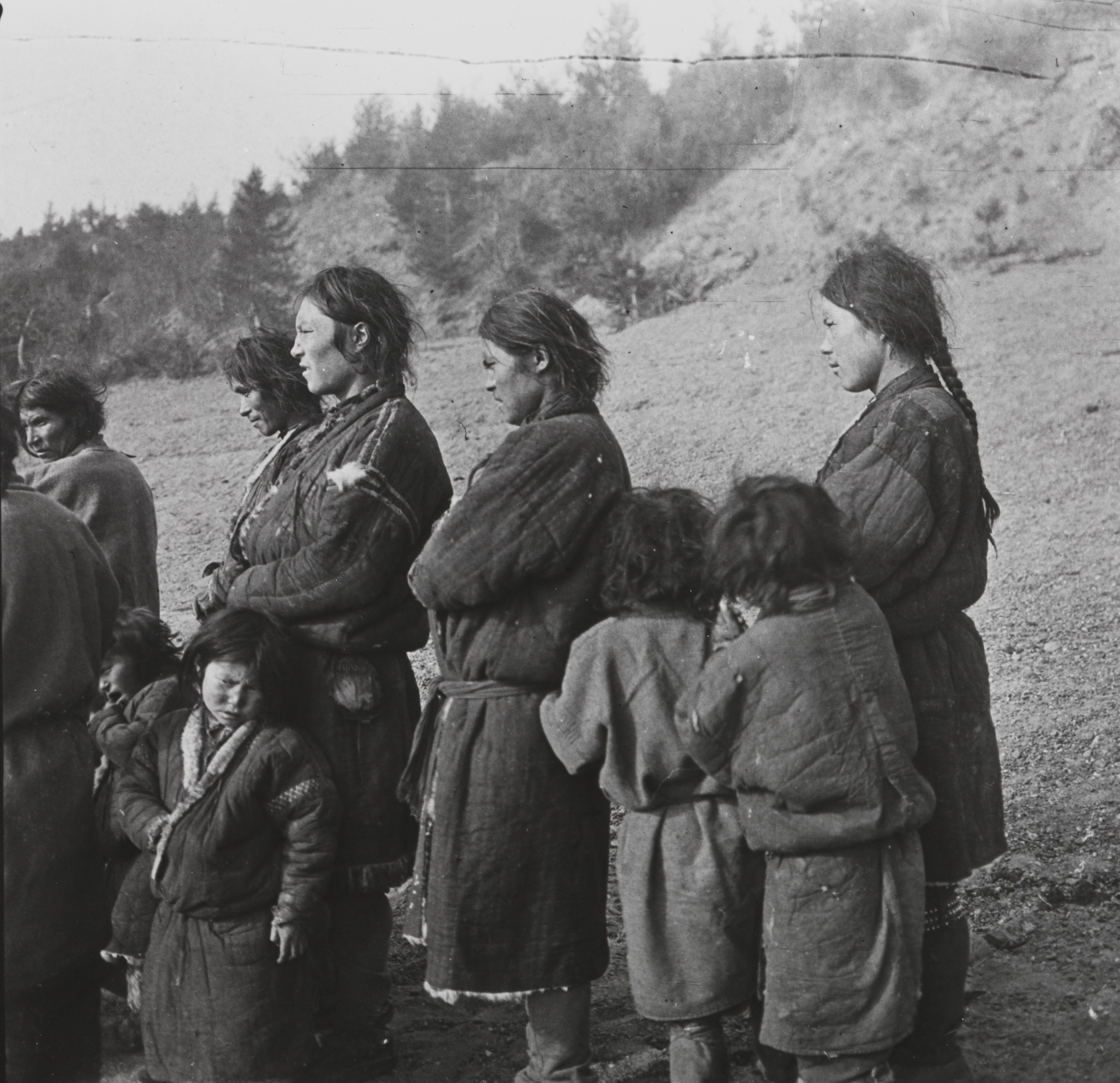

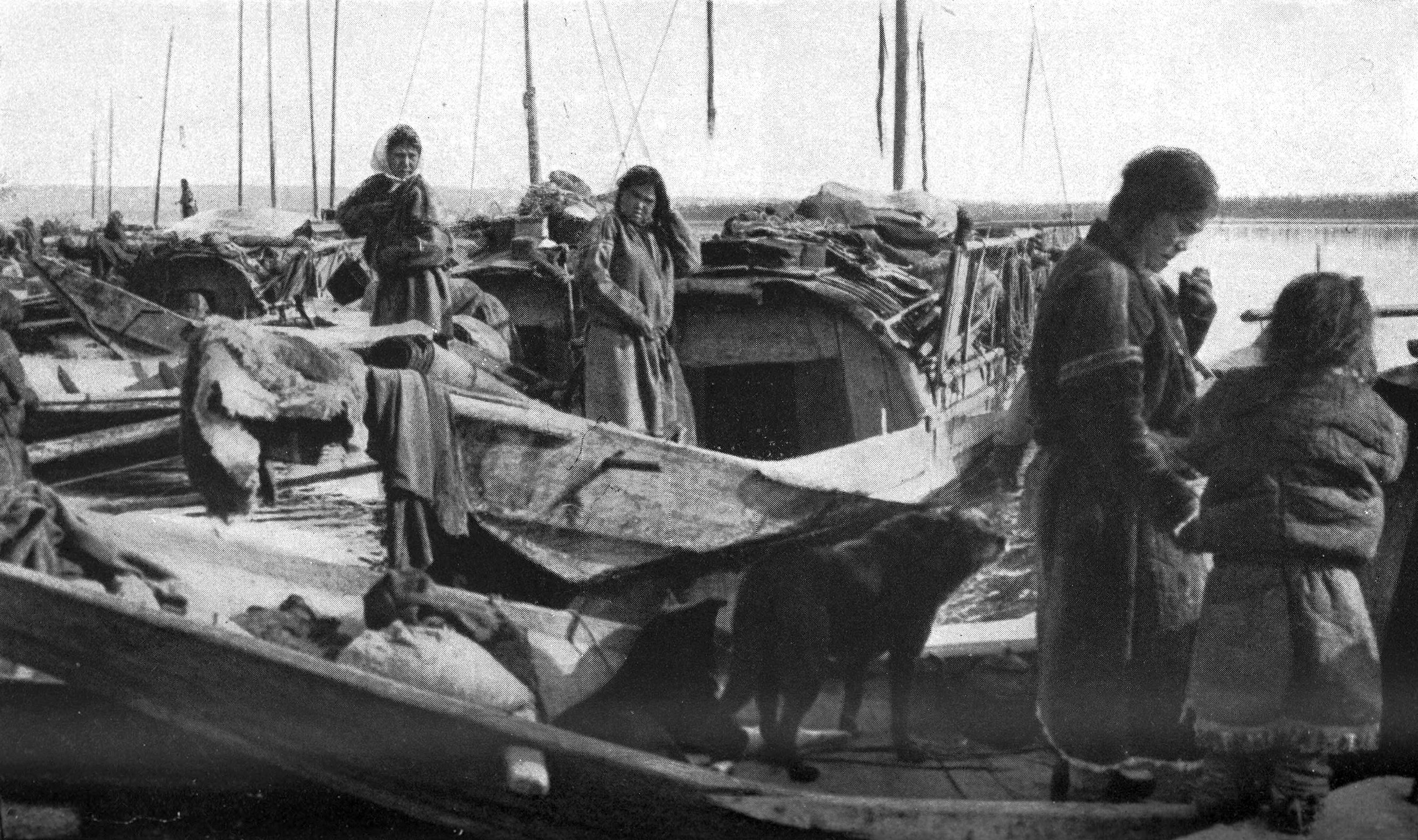
Houseboats of the Ket

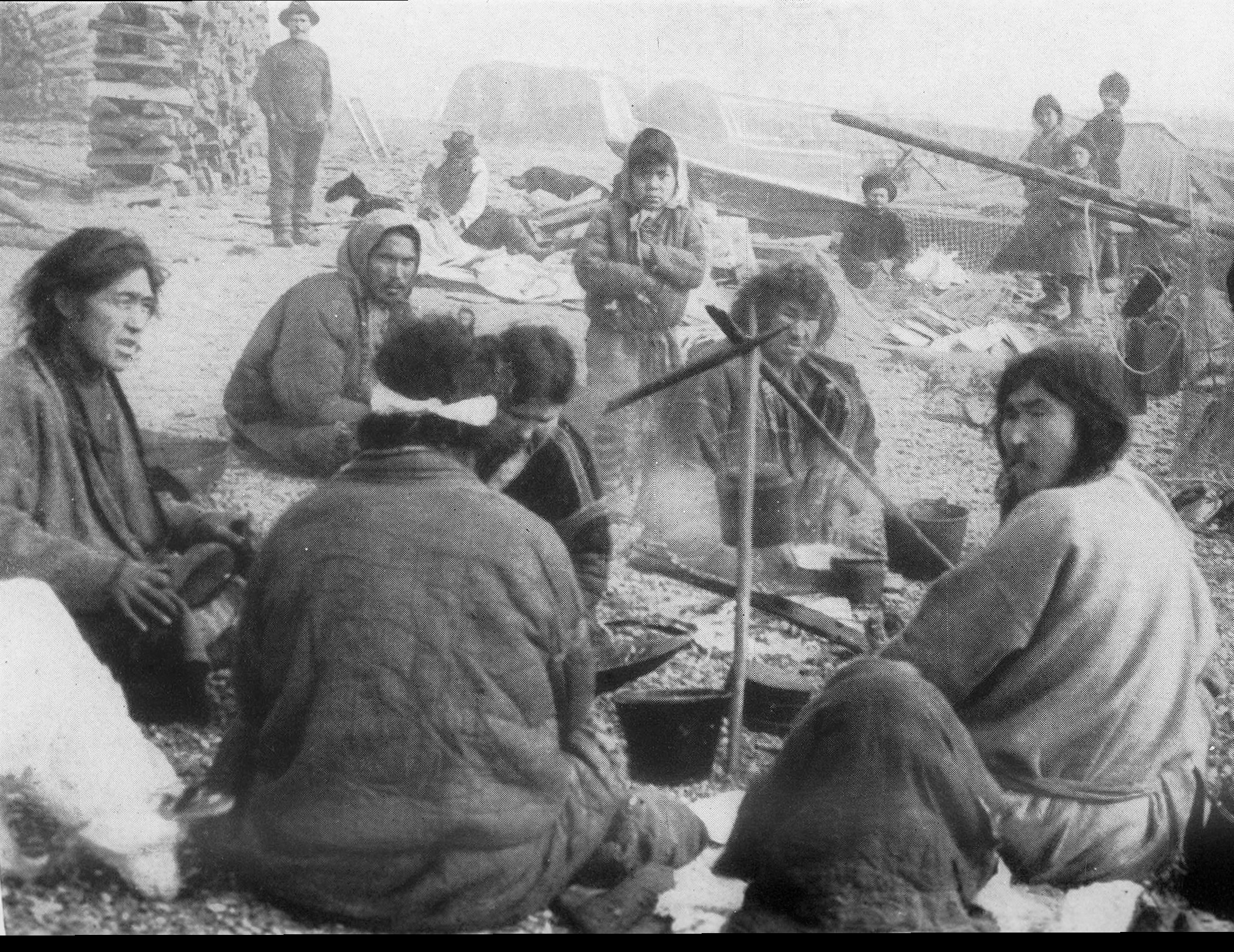
Group of Kets around a campfire. The people in the background wearing fur hats are Russians.

== Russo-Ukrainian War ==
During the Russo-Ukrainian War, a 50-year-old Ket man named Aleksandr, originally from the remote settlement of Kellogg in Krasnoyarsk Krai, was captured by Ukrainian forces on the Pokrovsk front while fighting as a soldier for the Russian military. The captive stated that he joined the army due to personal issues, such as "drinking" and "prison," and admitted that he did not speak the critically endangered Ket language and knew little of his people's culture, noting much of it had already been lost. The report highlighted that the 2021 Russian census recorded only 1,088 Kets.

== Notable Kets ==
- Alexander Kotusov, Ket singer

== See also ==
- Yeniseian languages
- Ket mythology
- List of indigenous peoples of Siberia
