= Kellog =

Kellog Келлог
- Village

Other transcription(s)
  - Ket: Ӄукдиӈиль, Кэллок
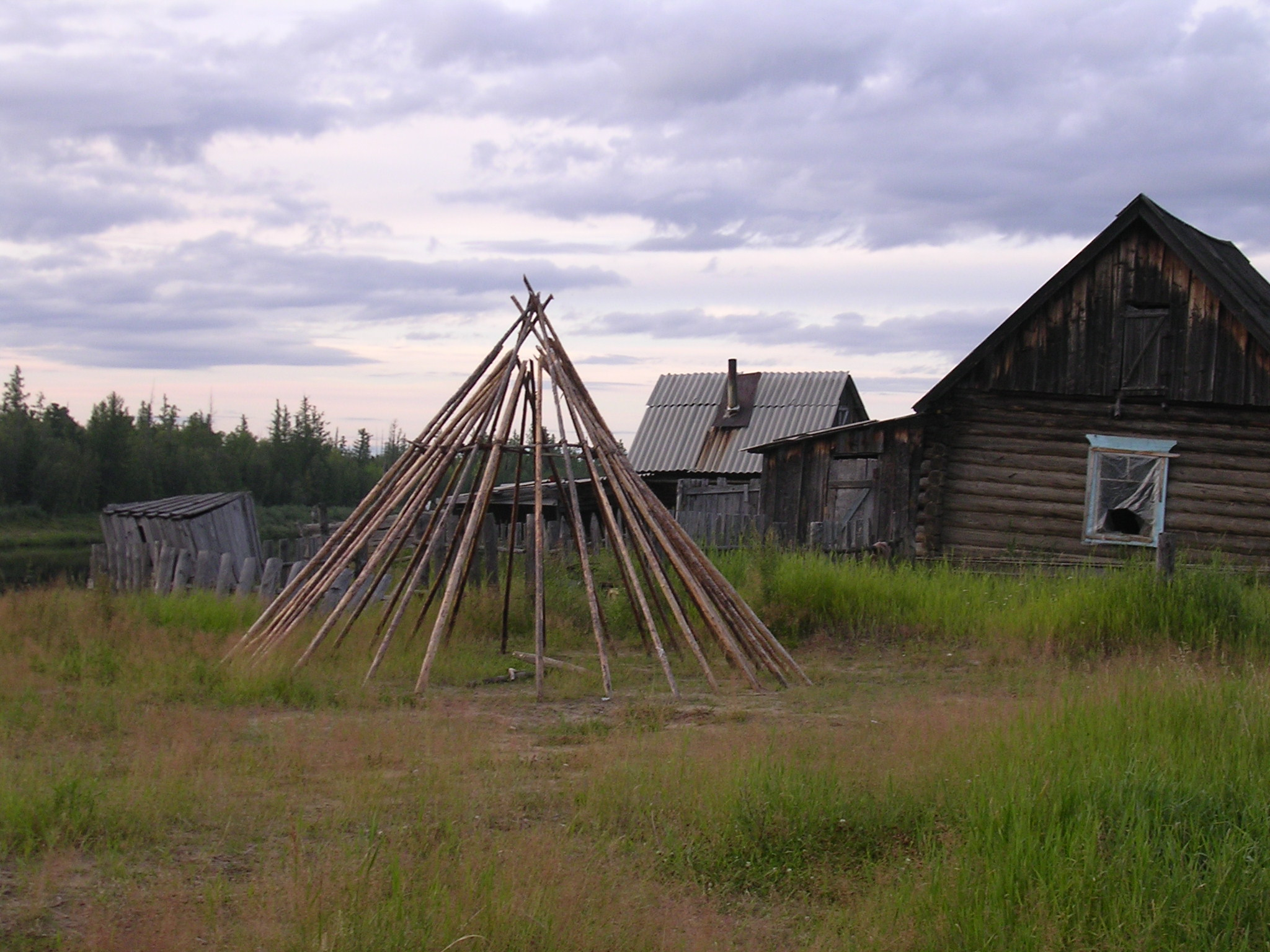
- Houses and chum frame in Kellog, 2008
- Interactive map of Kellog
- Location of Kellog Kellog (Krasnoyarsk Krai)
- Coordinates: 62°29′N 86°16′E
- Country: Russia
- Federal subject: Krasnoyarsk Krai
- Administrative district: Turukhansky District
- Elevation: 60 m (200 ft)

Population (2010 Census)
  - Total: 306
  - Estimate (2010): 306 (0%)

Municipal status
  - Municipal district: Turukhansk Mun. Dist. Inter-Settlement Territory
- Time zone: UTC+7 (MSK+4)
- Postal code: 663237
- OKTMO ID: 04654701932

Kellog (Russian: Келлог, Ket: Ӄукдиӈиль, Qūkdíŋilʲ or Кэллок, Kéllok) is a rural locality (a settlement) in Turukhansky District of Krasnoyarsk Krai, Russia. It is located by the Yeloguy river, below its confluence with the Kellog river.

== Population ==
Kellog is one of the three localities in which the Ket people, a Yeniseian ethnic group historically widespread along the Yenisey river, live. It is also the only location in Russia where the Ket language is taught in schools.

Ket people in Kellog speak the Southern Ket dialect, the most widespread of the three Ket varieties. It is distinct from those spoken in the other two Ket localities, Central Ket in Surgutikha and Northern Ket in Maduyka.

As of the 2010 Census, the ethnic composition in Kellog was as follows:

- Ket people: 216 (70.6%)
- Russians: 71 (23.2%)
- Others: 19 (6.2%)

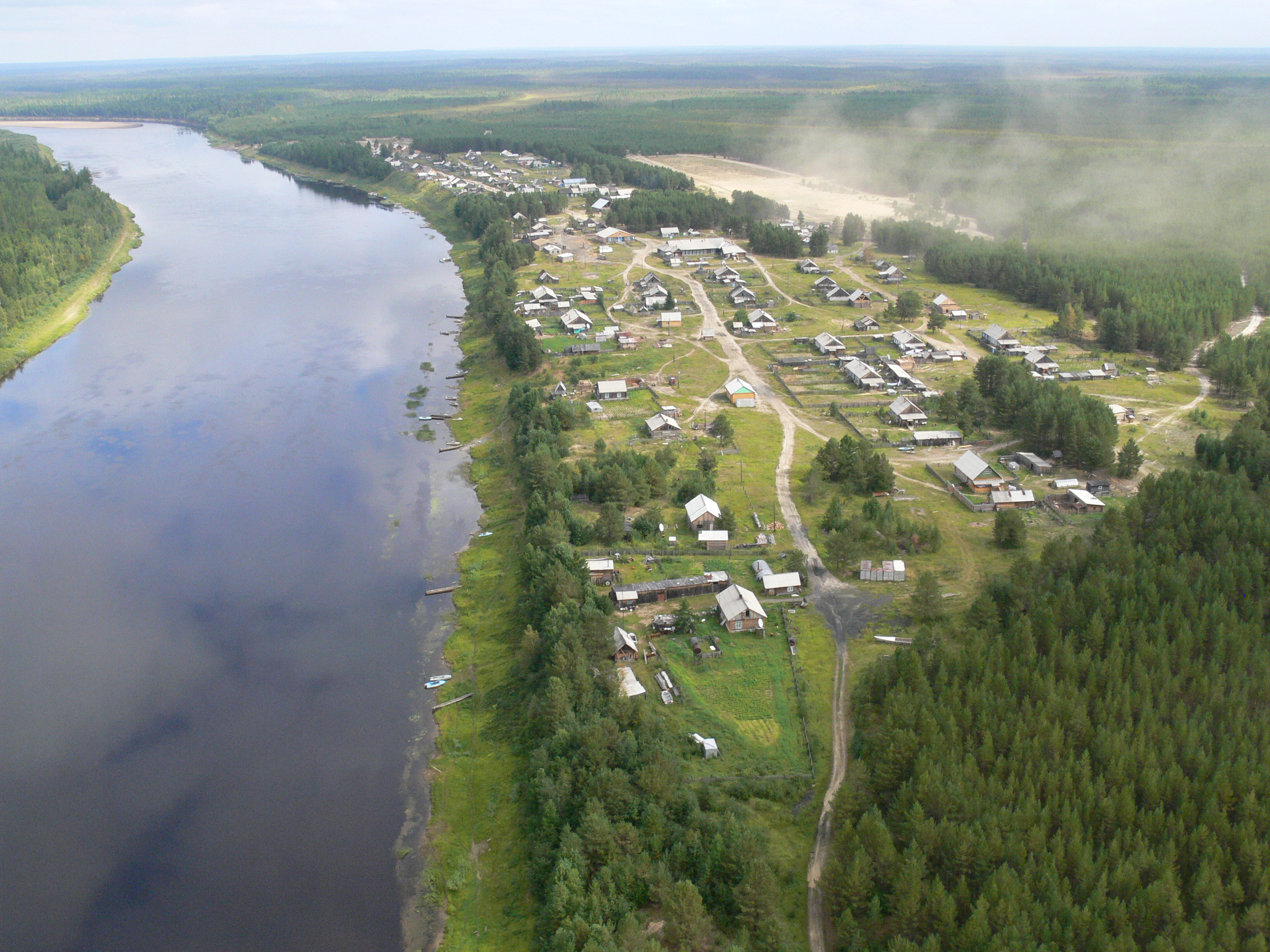
Kellog and the Yeloguy River from helicopter, 2008

The tomb of Alexander Kotusov (1955–2019), a Ket folk singer and poet, is near the village.
