= Svetlogorsky (inhabited locality) =

Svetlogorsky (Russian: Светлого́рский; masculine), Svetlogorskaya (Светлого́рская; feminine), or Svetlogorskoye (Светлого́рское; neuter) is the name of several rural localities in Russia:

- Svetlogorsky (rural locality), a settlement in Cheremshansky District of the Republic of Tatarstan
- Svetlogorskoye (rural locality), a selo in Svetlogorsky Rural Okrug of Abinsky District of Krasnodar Krai
