= Turukhansky District =

Turukhansky District Туруханский район (Russian)
- District
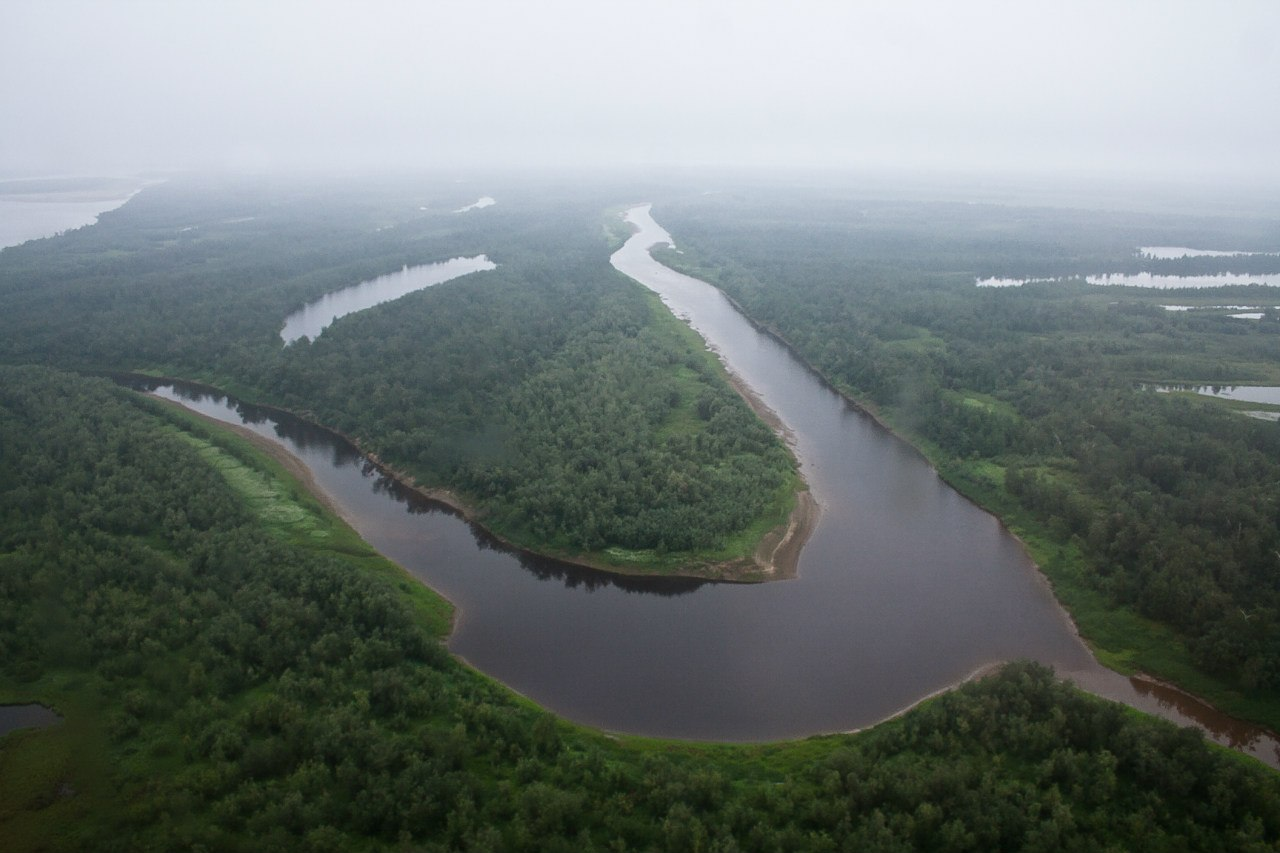
- Turukhansky Nature Reserve, Turukhansky District

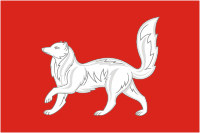
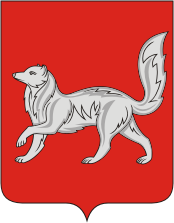
- Flag Coat of arms
- Location of Turukhansky District in Krasnoyarsk Krai
- Coordinates: 64°N 88°E
- Country: Russia
- Federal subject: Krasnoyarsk Krai
- Established: June 7, 1928
- Administrative center: Turukhansk

Government
  - Type: Local government
  - Body: Turukhansky District Council of Deputies
  - Head: Anatoly I. Goloded

Area
  - Total: 211,189 km^{2} (81,541 sq mi)

Population (2010 Census)
  - Total: 18,708
  - Density: 0.088584/km^{2} (0.22943/sq mi)
  - Urban: 38.5%
  - Rural: 61.5%

Administrative structure
  - Administrative divisions: 1 District towns, 6 Selsoviets
  - Inhabited localities: 1 cities/towns, 33 rural localities

Municipal structure
  - Municipally incorporated as: Turukhansky Municipal District
  - Municipal divisions: 1 urban settlements, 6 rural settlements
- Time zone: UTC+7 (MSK+4)
- OKTMO ID: 04654000
- Website: http://www.admtr.ru/

Turukhansky District (Russian: Туруха́нский райо́н) is an administrative and municipal district (raion), one of the forty-three in Krasnoyarsk Krai, Russia. It is located in the west of the krai and borders with Taymyrsky Dolgano-Nenetsky District in the north, Evenkiysky District in the east, Yeniseysky District in the south, and with Tyumen Oblast in the west. The area of the district is 211,189 square kilometers (81,541 sq mi). Its administrative center is the rural locality (a selo) of Turukhansk. Population: 18,708 (2010 census); 12,439 (2002 Census); 19,257 (1989 Soviet census). The population of Turukhansk accounts for 24.9% of the district's total population.

Historical population
Year	Pop.	±%
1897	12,000	—
1959	14,105	+17.5%
1970	11,284	−20.0%
1979	13,766	+22.0%
1989	19,257	+39.9%
2002	12,439	−35.4%
2010	18,708	+50.4%
2021	12,808	−31.5%
Source: Census data

== Geography ==
The following tributaries of the Yenisey flow through the district: the Podkamennaya Tunguska River, the Bakhta River, the Yeloguy River, the Nizhnyaya Tunguska River, the Turukhan River, and the Kureyka River.

== History ==
The district was founded on June 7, 1928. Historically the area served as a site of exile, to which individuals such as Ariadna Èfron (1949–1955) were banished. One center of such imprisonments was the gulag at Yermakovo, Krasnoyarsk Krai, built 1949 under the orders of Joseph Stalin, who himself had spent 1913 to 1917 exiled in the area. The prison was dismantled in 1955 two years after his death.

Later, the Central Siberia Nature Reserve was established in a sector of the district in 1985 as a protected area of the East Siberian taiga ecoregion. In 2013 the Museum of Taiga Traditions was established in Bakhta village.

== Administrative divisions ==
Administrative divisions of Turukhansky District
Municipal division	Russian name	Administrative center	Number of seats	km^{2}	Inhabitants (2017)
Urban settlement					
Igarka	город Игарка	Igarka	1	117,20	4754
Rural settlements					
Borsky Selsoviet	Борский сельсовет	Bor	4	598,88	2574
Verknheimbatsky Selsoviet	Верхнеимбатский сельсовет	Verknheimbatsk	2	751,43	510
Vorogovsky Selsoviet	Вороговский сельсовет	Vorogovo	3	24,62	1377
Zotinsky Selsoviet	Зотинский сельсовет	Zotino	1	200,00	447
Svetlogorsky Selsoviet	Светлогорский сельсовет	Svetlogorsk	1	3,50	876
Turukhansky Selsoviet	Туруханский сельсовет	Turukhansk	2	1,86	4289
Inter-Settlement Territory					
Inter-Settlement Territory	Межселенная территория		20		

== Government ==
Turukhansky District Council of Deputies of the VI convocation

Date of election: 13/09/2020 Term of office: 5 years

Factions

Faction	Deputies
United Russia	12
LDPR	2
CPRF	3
A Just Russia	4

Chairman

- Yuri Tagirov

Head of the Turukhansky District

- Oleg Sheremetyev. Date of election: 27/11/2020. Term of office: 5 years.

== Demographics ==
The district is home to most of the Ket people, a small Yeniseian ethnic group whose language is thought by some linguists to be related to the Na-Dene languages of North America. Nowadays, most of people still speaking Ket live in just three localities: Kellog, Surgutikha, and Maduyka, all of which are situated in Turukhansky District.

Before the collapse of the Soviet Union, the district was predominantly made up of Lithuanians, Germans, Russians, Tatars and Poles. When the Soviet Union fell apart, many of these peoples moved back to their respective countries, turning the entire area into an almost entirely Slavic one populated by Ukrainians, Belarusians, and Russians. Aside from Slavic populations, around 10% of the district is made up of Ket people, and a few German families.

== Notable people ==
- Joseph Stalin lived in exile on the territory of the modern district before the October Revolution.
- Alexander Kotusov (1955 - 2019), Ket folk singer, composer and writer of songs in the Ket language.
- Vasilina Makovtseva (born 1977), film and theater actress.
