= Ket language =

Yeniseian language spoken in Siberia

Ket
- Yenisei Ostyak
- Остыганна ӄаʼ Òstɨkanna qaˀ Остыганбесь Òstɨkanbesʲ
- Pronunciation: /ostɨ̀kanna qaˀ/, [ɔs˩˧.tɯ˥˩.ɣan.na qaʔ˥˧]
- Native to: Russia
- Region: Krasnoyarsk Krai
- Ethnicity: 1,088 Ket (2021)
- Native speakers: <30 (2024); 153 (2020 census)
- Language family: Yeniseian: Ketic; Ket
- Dialects: Northern; Central; Southern
- Writing system: Cyrillic

Official status
- Recognised minority language in: Russia: Krasnoyarsky Krai; Evenkiysky District; Turukhansky District

Language codes
- ISO 639-3: ket
- Glottolog: kett1243
- ELP: Ket
- Linguasphere: 43-AAA-a
- Map of pre-contact Yeniseian languages

- Ket is classified as Severely Endangered by the UNESCO Atlas of the World's Languages in Danger.

The Ket (/ˈkɛt/ KET) language, or more specifically Imbak and formerly known as Yenisei Ostyak (/ˈɒstiæk/ OSS-tee-ak), is the sole surviving language of the Yeniseian language family. It is spoken along the middle Yenisei basin by the Ket people.

The language is threatened with extinction—the number of ethnic Kets that are native speakers of the language dropped from 1,225 in 1926 to 537 in 1989. According to the latest reports from linguists, this number has since fallen to less than 30. A 2005 census reported 485 native speakers, but this number is suspected to be inflated. According to a local news source, the number of remaining Ket speakers is around 10 to 20. Another Yeniseian language, Yugh, became extinct in the 1970s.

== History ==
=== Documentation ===
The earliest observations about the language were recorded by Daniel Gottlieb Messerschmidt in 1723, in a travel diary, where the oldest extant Ket vocabulary, belonging to the Eed-Šeš dialect, (эрь-сесь, lit. 'sable-river') was recorded. During the 19th century, the Ket were mistaken for a tribe of the Finno-Ugric Khanty. A. Karger in 1934 published the first grammar (Кетский язык Ketskij jazyk), as well as a Ket primer (Букварь на кетском языке Bukvar' na ketskom jazyke), and a new treatment appeared in 1968, written by A. Kreinovich.

=== Decline and current use ===
Ket people were subjected to collectivization in the 1930s. In the 1950s and 1960s, according to the recollections of informants, they were sent to Russian-only boarding schools, which led to the ceasing of language transmission between generations. As of 2013, Ket is taught as a subject in some primary schools, but only older adults are fluent and few are raising their children with the language. Kellog, Russia, is the only place where Ket is still taught in schools. Special books are provided for grades second through fourth but after those grades there is only Russian literature to read that describes Ket culture. There are no known monolingual speakers as of 2006. A children's book, A Bit Lost by Chris Haughton, was translated into the language in 2013. Alexander Kotusov was a Ket folk singer and poet who died in 2019.

Only three localities, Kellog, Surgutikha and Maduyka, retain a native Ket-speaking population in the present day. Other villages such as Serkovo and Pakulikha were destroyed in the second half of the 20th century, dispersing the local Ket population to nearby towns.

== Dialects ==
Ket has three dialects: Southern (Upper Inbatz), Central and Northern (collectively Lower Inbatz). All the dialects are very similar to each other and Kets from different groups are able to understand each other. The most common southern dialect was used for the standardized written Ket.

The three remaining Ket-majority localities natively speak different dialects. Southern Ket is spoken in Kellog, Central Ket in Surgutikha and Northern Ket in Maduyka.

== Phonology ==
=== Vowels ===
	Front	Central	Back
Close	i	ɨ ~ ɯ	u
Mid	e ~ ɛ	ə ~ ʌ	o ~ ɔ
Open	æ ~ a ~ ɐ ~ ɑ		

- The normally open-mid /ɛ, ɔ/ are realized as close-mid [e, o], respectively, when they have the high-steady tone.
- /a/ is realized as [æ, a, ɐ, ɑ] in free variation.
- Georg classifies /ɛ, ɔ, ʌ, æ/ as marginal phonemes.

=== Consonants ===
Vajda analyses Ket as having only 12 consonant phonemes:

		Bilabial	Alveolar	Palatal	Velar	Uvular	Glottal
Nasal		m	n		ŋ		
Plosive	voiceless		t		k	q	
Plosive	voiced	b	d				
Fricative	median		s	ç			h
Fricative	lateral		ɮ				

It is one of the few languages to lack both /p/ and /ɡ/, along with Arapaho, Una (Goliath), Obokuitai, Palauan, and Efik, as well as classical Arabic and some modern Arabic dialects.

There is much allophony, and the phonetic inventory of consonants is essentially as below. This is the level of description reflected by the Ket alphabet.

			Bilabial	Alveolar	Palatal	Velar	Uvular	Glottal
Nasal			m	n		ŋ		
Plosive		voiceless	p	t		k	q	ʔ
Plosive		voiced	b	d		ɡ	ɢ	
Fricative	median	voiceless		s	ç	(x)	(χ)	h
Fricative	median	voiced	β		ʝ	ɣ	ʁ	
Fricative	lateral	voiced		ɮ				
Vibrant		tap		ɾ				
Vibrant		trill		r				

Furthermore, all nasal consonants in Ket have voiceless allophones at the end of a monosyllabic word with a glottalized or descending tone (i.e. /m, n, ŋ/ turn into [m̥, n̥, ŋ̊]), likewise, /ɮ/ becomes [ɬ] in the same situation. Alveolars are often pronounced laminal and possibly palatalized, though not in the vicinity of a uvular consonant. /q/ is normally pronounced with affrication, as [𐞥χ].

=== Tone ===
Descriptions of Ket vary widely in the number of contrastive tones they report: as many as eight and as few as zero have been counted. Given this wide disagreement, whether or not Ket is a tonal language is debatable, although recent works by Ket specialists Edward Vajda and Stefan Georg defend the existence of tone.

In tonal descriptions, Ket does not employ a tone on every syllable but instead uses one tone per word. Following Stefan Georg's model of Southern Ket tone, which is also adapted by the more recent works on Ket and Yeniseian, the following can be inferred:

Tone name	First tone (even, half-long)	Second tone (laryngealized)	Third tone (rising-falling, long)	Fourth tone (sharp falling)	"Fifth tone" (First disyllabic contour)	"Sixth tone" (Second disyllabic contour)
Tone contour	[aˑ˧] (or [aˑ˧˥])	[aʔ˥˧]	[aː˩˥˧]	[a˥˩]	[a˩˧ɔ˧˩] (across two syllables)	[a˩˧ɔ˥˩] (across two syllables)
Example	сюль (sūlʲ, “blood”)	сюʼль (suˀlʲ, “Siberian white salmon (sp. Stenodus leucichytus)”)	сюуль (súùlʲ, “snow sled”)	сюль (sùlʲ, “cradle hook”)	сюга (súka, “Northern shoveler (sp. Anas clypeata”)	силюп (sìlub, “tuft, wisp, shock of hair”)

== Orthography ==
In the 1930s a Latin-based alphabet was developed and used for a very brief window of time:

A a	Ā ā	Æ æ	B ʙ	C c	D d	E e	Ē ē
Ə ə	F f	G g	H h	Ꜧ ꜧ	I i	Ī ī	J j
K k	L l	Ļ ļ	M m	N n	Ņ ņ	Ŋ ŋ	O o
Ō ō	P p	Q q	R r	S s	Ş ş	T t	U u
Ū ū	V v	Z z	Ƶ ƶ	Ь ь

In the 1980s a new, Cyrillic-based, alphabet was created:

А а	Б б	В в	Г г	Ӷ ӷ	Д д	Е е	Ё ё
Ж ж	З з	И и	Й й	К к	Ӄ ӄ	Л л	М м
Н н	Ӈ ӈ	О о	Ө ө	П п	Р р	С с	Т т
У у	Ф ф	Х х	Ц ц	Ч ч	Ш ш	Щ щ	Ъ ъ
Ә ә	Ы ы	Ь ь	ʼ	Э э	Ю ю	Я я

Cyrillic	IPA
А а	a
Б б	b
В в	β
Г г	ɡ (~ ɣ)
Ӷ ӷ	ɢ (~ ʁ)
Д д	d
Е е	ʲe
Ё ё	ʲɔ
И и	i
Й й	ʝ (~ ç)
К к	k
Ӄ ӄ	q
Л л	ɮ (~ ɬ)
М м	m
Н н	n
Ӈ ӈ	ŋ
О о	ɔ
Ө ө	o
П п	p
Р р	ɾ (~ ɾ̥)
С с	s
Т т	t
У у	u
Х х	h
Ъ ъ	ʌ
ʼ	ˀ
Ә ә	ɤ
Ы ы	ɯ
Ь ь	ʲ
Э э	ɛ
Ю ю	ʲu
Я я	ʲa

== Morphosyntax ==
Ket is classified as a synthetic language. Verbs use prefixes, while suffixes are rare outside nominal domain; incorporation is well-developed. The basic word order is subject–object–verb (SOV).

Nouns have nominative basic case (subjects and direct objects) and a system of secondary cases for spatial relations. The three noun classes are: masculine, feminine and inanimate.

Unlike the neighbouring Siberian languages, Ket makes use of verbal prefixes, classified based on the conjugation classes of the verbs that are not lexically transparent. Five such conjugation types exist, denoting various patterns verb prefixes can be appended to the verb-action nominal compound.

Ket makes significant use of incorporation. Incorporation is not limited to nouns, and can also include verbs, adverbs, adjectives, and bound morphemes found only in the role of incorporated elements. Incorporation also occurs as both a lexicalized process—the combination of verb and incorporate being treated as a distinct lexical element, with a meaning often based around the incorporated element—and a paradigmatic one, wherein the incorporation is performed spontaneously for particular semantic and pragmatic effect.

Forms of incorporation include:

- Nominal incorporation, most commonly used to describe the instrumental part of an action, but sometimes used to describe patients instead. Instrumental incorporation does not affect the transitivity of the verb (though there are examples where this form of incorporation is used to describe agentless changes of state), while patient incorporation can make a transitive verb intransitive. Patient incorporation is usually used for patients that are wholly effected by an action (such as being brought into existence by it); more generally affected patients are typically incorporated only when significantly defocused or backgrounded.
- Verbal incorporation, more specifically the incorporation of verbal infinitives (rather than roots) into the verb complex. This form of incorporation is used to signify aspect and form causatives. Incorporated infinitives may bring incorporated elements of their own into the verb as well.
- Adjectival incorporation, with an incorporated adjective describing the target or final state of an action.
- Adverbial incorporation, where a local adverb is used to describe the direction or path of a movement.

The division between morphemes is based on fusion. Sandhi are common as well. The name marking is of Ezāfe-type, the same as in predication.

=== Number ===
Ket has two grammatical numbers, the singular and plural. This is usually expressed by the presence or absence of -n (individuated plural) or -ŋ (collective plural), the plural suffixes. The old singulative suffix -s is present on certain singular forms, however, like the stem tɨˀs 'stone' > təˀŋ 'stones'. Some shape-classifying suffixes have developed and are mildly productive.

=== Noun declension ===
hīk "man" (masculine noun)
Case	Singular	Plural
Nominative	hīk-Ø	hīk-en-Ø
Genitive	hīk-da	hīk-en-na
Dative	hīk-daŋa	hīk-en-naŋa
Benefactive	hīk-data	hīk-en-nata
Ablative	hīk-daŋal	hīk-en-naŋal
Adessive	hīk-daŋta	hīk-en-naŋta
Locative	-	-
Prosecutive	hīk-bes	hīk-en-bes
Instrumental	hīk-as	hīk-en-as
Abessive	hīk-an	hīk-en-an
Translative	hīk-esaŋ	hīk-en-esaŋ
Vocative	hīk-ó	hīk-en-ə́

qīm "woman" (feminine noun)
Case	Singular	Plural
Nominative	qīm-Ø	qīm-n-Ø
Genitive	qīm-di	qīm-n-di
Dative	qīm-diŋa	qīm-n-diŋa
Benefactive	qīm-dita	qīm-n-dita
Ablative	qīm-diŋal	qīm-n-diŋal
Adessive	qīm-diŋta	qīm-n-diŋta
Locative	-	-
Prosecutive	qīm-bes	qīm-n-bes
Instrumental	qīm-as	qīm-n-as
Abessive	qīm-an	qīm-n-an
Translative	qīm-esaŋ	qīm-n-esaŋ
Vocative	qīm-ə́	qīm-n-ə́

doˀn "knife" (neuter noun)
Case	Singular	Plural
Nominative	doˀn-Ø	dón-aŋ-Ø
Genitive	dón-di	dón-aŋ-di
Dative	dón-diŋa	dón-aŋ-diŋa
Benefactive	dón-dita	dón-aŋ-dita
Ablative	dón-diŋal	dón-aŋ-diŋal
Adessive	dón-diŋta	dón-aŋ-diŋta
Locative	dón-ka	dón-aŋ-ka
Prosecutive	dón-bes	dón-aŋ-bes
Instrumental	dón-as	dón-aŋ-as
Abessive	dón-an	dón-aŋ-an
Translative	dón-esaŋ	dón-aŋ-esaŋ
Vocative	-	-

=== Verb paradigm ===
Unlike other contemporary languages in Siberia, Ket employs a rigid and regular system of prefixes that can occupy prefix positions P8, P6, P4, P3, P1 and P-1; where prefix position P0 (or R) denotes the root of the verb and P7 is the action nominal (or the verb incorporate.) The function of the prefix slots can be summarized as follows:

- P8 marks the subject person
- P7 marks the lexical incorporate; where it can either be a noun or an action nominal (infinitive verb)
- P6 marks the subject or the object person
- P5 marks the lexical determiner (also called a theme marker)
- P4 marks a wide variety of meanings depending on the verb, conjugation class and the verb template
- P3 marks the neuter object person
- P2 marks the tense marker, which itself denotes telicity
- P1 marks the subject or the object person
- P0 (R) marks the verb root
- P-1 marks the plural subjects

All verb conjugations except the second mark P8, but in some deterministic circumstances where the prefix position P7 or P6 slots are filled with consonant-initial morphemes, subject person morpheme in the prefix in P8 except the third person feminine person (‘she’) is dropped.

- Дусьӄадирий. (Dūsʲqadidij. «di⁸꞊ūsʲ⁷-q⁵-a⁴-di¹-dij⁰», “I get warm.”) but:
- Боксьтэт. (Boksʲtet. «[di⁸꞊]boˀk⁷-sʲ⁴-tet⁰», “I strike fire.”)
- Дабоксьтэт. (Daboksʲtet. «da⁸꞊boˀk⁷-sʲ⁴-tet⁰», “She strikes fire.”)

Whether or not a prefix slot will be filled can only be inferred from a verb's conjugation class, but general patterns exist that govern this process. Also notably, the morpheme -a in prefix slot P4 turns into phonetic [ɔ] in preterite and imperative functions of the verb, for which see examples below.

Example conjugations from each conjugation class can briefly be given as follows, adapted from Vajda-Zinn (2004):

- Conjugation class I:
  - (а-бет, a⁴-[l²]-bed⁰)
    - Даббет. (Dábbet. «di⁸꞊a⁴-b³-bed⁰», “I wipe it [off.]” — b³ marks the neuter-class object ‘it’)
    - Добильбет. (Dóbilʲbet. «di⁸꞊a⁴-b³-l²-bed⁰», “I wiped it [off.]” — preterite, a⁴ turns into [ɔ].)
- Conjugation class II:
  - (тугун-т-а-гит, tukun⁷-t⁵-a⁴-[l²]-kit⁰ — with verb incorporate тугун “comb, hairbrush.” + -кит “rubbing, moving along a surface”)
    - Тугунбатагит. (Túkunbatakit. «[ku⁸꞊]túkun⁷-ba⁶-t⁵-a⁴-kit⁰», “Thou combest my hair.”)
    - Тугункутольгит. (Túkunkutolʲkit.. «[di⁸꞊]túkun⁷-ku⁶-t⁵-a⁴-l²-kit⁰», “I combed thy hair.” — preterite, a⁴ turns into [ɔ].)
    - Датугунатагит. (Datúkunatakit. «da⁸꞊túkun⁷-a⁶-t⁵-a⁴-kit⁰», “She combs his hair.” — da⁸꞊ ‘She’, -a⁶ ‘him’)
- Conjugation class III:
  - (да-сюлей-к-(с)я, da⁸꞊súlej⁷-k⁵-[s⁴]-[l²]-a⁰ — da⁸꞊ is a dummy pronoun.)
    - Дасюлеёкся. (Dasúlejoksa. «da⁸꞊súlej⁷-o⁶-k⁵-s⁴-a⁰», “He is blushing.”)
    - Дасюлеюкся. (Dasúlejuksa. «da⁸꞊súlej⁷-u⁶-k⁵-s⁴-a⁰», “She is blushing.”)
- Conjugation class IV:
  - (к-а-гънь, k⁵-a⁴-[n²]-kən⁰)
    - Каригъънь. (Kadikəːnʲ. «[di⁸꞊]k⁵-a⁴-di¹-kən⁰», “I sit down.”)
    - Каягъънь. (Kajakəːnʲ. «[du⁸꞊]k⁵-a⁴-a¹-kən⁰», “He sits down.”)
    - Дакаягъънь. (Dakajakəːnʲ. «da⁸꞊k⁵-a⁴-a¹-kən⁰», “She sits down.”)
    - Даконагъънь. (Dakonakəːnʲ. «da⁸꞊k⁵-a⁴-n²-a¹-kən⁰», “She sat down.” — preterite, a⁴ turns into [ɔ].)
- Conjugation class V:
  - (мяӷай-б-(ет)та, mákaj⁷-b³-[l²]-a¹-ta⁰)
    - Мяӷайбетта. (Mákajbetta. «[d⁸꞊]mákaj⁷-b³-a¹-ta⁰», “She meows, Her meowing is heard.” — ‘cat’ in Ket is a feminine-class noun.)
    - As a general rule, conjugation class V is mostly reserved for onomatopoeic verbs. Also unlike the conjugation classes I-IV, they use nominal possessive prefixes instead of verbal subject prefixes to yield ‘[Subject]'s (sound) is heard.’

== Lexicon ==
Most of the Ket nominal lexicon is monosyllabic and derive from native Yeniseian stock. In recent times, there have been borrowings from Russian, while historically Ket is prone to borrowing lexical items from neighbouring Samoyedic, Uralic, Turkic and Tungusic (Evenki) languages.

Some of the core vocabulary, including verbs and fundamental nouns, shows remarkable similarities to the Athabascan languages of the North America, prompting some to claim a common linguistic phylum.

== Sample text ==
Dotam, a Ket fairy tale
Ket (Cyrillic sc., modern orthography)	Ket (Phonemic, tone omitted)	English translation
1. Баат баамас долин, долин.; 2. Буӈнаӈт хъня хыʼп овильда.; 3. Буӈ саʼӈ бат оӈон, хыʼп ӄа бат датобаӄн.; 4. Бись уська бат динбесьн, саaӈна кәйган бинаӈ билян, хыʼпдат таӈа саӈна булеӈ бат тобаӄн.; 5. Буңна хыʼп бат дильден саңна булеӈ бәнән дуб.; 6. Буда обаӈ си бат толяӈан.; 7. Бу си дугде бат дильден.; 8. Дотам баам даинбесь, хыʼпда хый ӄибась даусбильтет, тулиӈ әла дабутоблей, боʼкдиңа даесоӈдаӄ, хыʼп даолдоӄ.; 9. Хыʼпда амаӈ ӄоноӄс хилаӈтесин.; 10. Буӈна хыʼпда иӈгий бәнсяӈ.; 11. Дотам баам даольдоӄ.; 12. Баат бада: «Баамо!; 13. Аттась ӄа касьнам.»; 14. Баам аттась ӄа дакайнам.; 15. Баат аттась добни.; 16. Дотам баамдиӈа огонь.; 17. Дотам баам аттасясь дальтетна.; 18. Дотам баам кәйга дилунбет, бинда уська динбесь.; 19. Баамдиӈа хъня бимний дотам баамди хуʼн даинбесь, мана: «Абаӈа марамсанка ӄътгетин, амди кәйга адат, ам даесилаӄ.»; 20. Баат аятаңабинсаӈ, аттасясь дотам баамди хуʼн диӄэй.; 21. Баат огонь дотам баам бобсе диӄэй.; 22. Дотам баамди баат дигдоӄон.; 23. Баат дотам баамди баатдаӈа бада: «Атась даӈон сиэн, ӄадий у ат илдоӄ.»; 24. Дотәт баат баатась хиссыйдиңа огонь.; 25. Оксьдаӈаль сакътлъӈ ханьдо, тыʼндиӈа добильда, ул датбияӄ, боʼк билбет, тыʼн даӈӄимна.; 26. Дотәт баатдаңа бада: «Ӄибо, кадо, тыʼн акс каӄан!»; 27. Дотәт баат бат колдо, хай бат колдо.; 28. Баат тыʼн кайнам, ааӈ тыʼн Дотәт баатда ътиӈа датбияӄ.; 29. Дотәт баат боʼк даолдoӄ.; 30. Баат былда даӈӄэй.; 31. Баат биндада баамась дигдаӄан.	1. Baːt baːmas dolin dolin.; 2. Buŋnaŋt həna hɨb obilda.; 3. Buŋ saŋ bat oŋon hɨb qa bat datobaqn.; 4. Bis uska bat dinbesn saːŋna kəjgan binaŋ bilan hɨbdat taŋa saːŋna buleŋ bat tobaqn.; 5. Buŋna hɨb bat dilden saŋna buleŋ bənən dub.; 6. Buda obaŋ si bat tolaŋan.; 7. Bu si dugde bat dilden.; 8. Dotam baːm dainbes hɨbda hɨj qibas dausbiltet tuliŋ əla dabutoblej.; 9. Hɨbda amaŋ qonoqs hilaŋtesin.; 10. Buŋna hɨbda iŋgij bənsaŋ.; 11. Dotam baːm daoldoq.; 12. Baːt bada: "Baːmo.; 13. Attas qa kasnam." 14. Baːm attas qa dakajnam.; 15. Baːt attas dobni.; 16. Dotam baːmdiŋa ogon.; 17. Dotam baːm attasas daltetna.; 18. Dotam baːm kəjga dilunbet binda uska dinbes.; 19. Baːmdiŋa həna bimnij dotam baːmdi hun dainbes mana: "Abaŋa maramsanka qətgetin amdi kəjga adat am daesilaq." 20. Baːt ajataŋabinsaŋ attasas dotam baːmdi hun diqej.; 21. Baːt ogon dotam baːm bobse diqej.; 22. Dotam baːmt baːt digdoqon.; 23. Baːt dotam baːmdi baːtdaŋa bada atas dəŋon sien qadij u at ildoq.; 24. Dotət baːt baːtas hissɨjdiŋa ogon.; 25. Oksdaŋal sakətləŋ hando tɨndiŋa dobilda ul datbijaq bok bilbet tɨn daŋqimna.; 26. Dotət baːtdaŋa bada: "Qibo, kado, tɨn aks kaqan!" 27. Dotət baːt bat koldo haj bat koldo.; 28. Baːt tɨn kajnam aːŋ tɨn dotət baːtda ədiŋa datbijaq.; 29. Dotət baːt bok daoldoq.; 30. Baːt bɨlda daŋqej.; 31. Baːt bindada baːmas digdaqan.	1. An old man and an old woman lived on.; 2. They had a little son.; 3. They went to hunt squirrels, leaving their son at home.; 4. They came home in the evening, ate the heads of the squirrels themselves, leaving only the squirrel paws for their son.; 5. Their son cried, for he did not eat squirrel paws.; 6. His parents went to bed at night.; 7. He cried the whole night.; 8. The old woman Dotam came, cut her son's belly in half, pulled out the intestines, put them in the fire, and ate her son.; 9. The parents got up in the morning.; 10. There was no rustle of their son.; 11. The old woman Dotam ate him.; 12. The old man said: "Hey, old woman!; 13. Take the spear home." 14. The old woman took the spear home.; 15. The old man sharpened the spear.; 16. He went to the old woman Dotam.; 17. He struck the old woman Dotam with a spear.; 18. He broke the old woman's head and returned home himself.; 19. A little later, the old woman's daughter Dotam came to the old woman and said: "Give me some maramsanka [grass], my mother has a headache, my mother has passed away." 20. The old man got angry and killed the old woman's daughter with the spear of the old woman Dotam.; 21. The old man went and killed the old woman Dotam completely.; 22. The old man stayed with the old woman Dotam.; 23. The old man said to the old woman Dotam: "Come with me to eat, then you can eat me." 24. The old man Dotet went into the forest with the old man.; 25. He chopped some wood chips from a tree, put them in a cauldron, poured water, made a fire, and boiled the cauldron.; 26. He said to the old man Dotet: "Uncle, look at how the cauldron is boiling!" 27. Old man Dotet looked on.; 28. The old man took the cauldron and poured the hot cauldron on old man Dotet.; 29. The fire consumed the old man Dotet.; 30. The old man killed everyone [in vicinity.]; 31. The old man stayed with his old woman.

=== Example sentences ===
Prefix positions in finite verbs are marked with superscript numerals for ease of inferring, where the superscript 0 marks the root morpheme and superscript 7 marks the verb incorporate position, as adapted from Vajda-Zinn (2004), Georg (2007) and Kotorova-Nefedov (2015). The following examples are adapted from Vajda-Zinn (2004):

- -рен (-den "Subject weeps.")
  - Дирен. (Díden. «di⁸꞊den⁰», "I am weeping.")
  - Дърен. (Də́den. «da⁸꞊den⁰», "She is weeping.")
- -к-а-тнь (-tn "Subject goes (in a single direction.)")
  - Боготнь. (Bókotnʲ. «ba⁶-k⁵-a⁴-tn⁰», "I am going.")
  - Уготнь. (Úkotnʲ. «u⁶-k⁵-a⁴-tn⁰», "She is going.")
    - [Personal inflections reside in prefix positions 8 and 6.]

The same verb root can be used in different configurations, using different verb incorporates for a variety of meanings:

- -ӄут (-qut "Subject assumes a new position.")
  - Adding preverbal elements to the root morpheme:
    - Дигагут. (Díkaqut. «di⁸꞊k⁵-a⁴-qut⁰», "I am climbing uphill.")
    - Дъгагут. (Də́kaqut. «da⁸꞊k⁵-a⁴-qut⁰», "She is climbing uphill.")
  - Adding verb incorporates to the root morpheme: (аӈ (àŋ, "rope"))
    - Аӈбагсют. (Áŋbaks[q]ut. «aŋ⁷-ba⁶-k⁵-s⁴-qut⁰», "I am tied up.")
    - Аӈигсют. (Áŋiks[q]ut. «aŋ⁷-i⁶-k⁵-s⁴-qut⁰», "She is tied up.")
      - [Personal inflections reside in prefix positions 8 and 6.]

== Literature ==
- Georg, Stefan (2007). A Descriptive Grammar of Ket (Yenisei-Ostyak). Leiden, The Netherlands: Brill. doi:10.1163/ej.9781901903584.i-328. ISBN 978-90-04-21350-0.
- Karger, N. K. (1934). Кетский язык. — Языки и письменность народов Севера. Vol. Ч. III. Moscow, Leningrad.
- Kotorova, Elizaveta, and Andrey Nefedov (eds.) (2015). Comprehensive Ket Dictionary / Большой словарь кетского языка (2 vols). Languages of the World/Dictionaries (LW/D) 57. Munich: Lincom Europa.
- Kreinovich, E. A. (1968). Кетский язык. — Языки народов СССР. Т. V., Leningrad.
- Vajda, Edward J. (2000). Ket Prosodic Phonology. Languages of the World. Vol. 15. Munich: Lincom Europa.
- Vajda, Edward J. (2001). Yeniseian Peoples and Languages: A History of Yeniseian Studies With an Annotated Bibliography and a Source Guide. Psychology Press. ISBN 0700712909.
- Vajda, Edward J. (2004). Ket. Languages of the World. Munich: Lincom Europa. ISBN 3-89586-221-5.
- Vajda, E.; Zinn, M. (2004). Morfologicheskii slovar ketskogo glagola: na osnove iuzhno-ketskogo dialekta. = Morphological dictionary of the Ket verb: Southern dialect /.
- Vajda, Edward J.; Kari, J.; Potter, B. (2010). "Siberian Link with Na-Dene Languages The Dene–Yeniseian Connection". Anthropological Papers of the University of Alaska, new series. Vol. 5. Fairbanks: University of Alaska Fairbanks, Department of Anthropology. pp. 33–99.
