= Xiongnu language =

Language spoken in the Xiongnu empire

Xiongnu
- Xiong-nu, Hsiung-nu
- Native to: Xiongnu Empire
- Region: eastern Eurasian Steppe
- Ethnicity: Xiongnu
- Era: 3rd century BCE-1st century CE? (Note: Extinction of standard dialect in the 1st century CE as a result of the collapse of Xiongnu. Recorded survivals in Liang and Xia dialect nomenclature until the 5th Century AD. Recorded survival of Yueban "Weak Xiongnu" until the 8th century CE and subsequent Turkification.)
- Language family: unclassified Indo-Iranian? (Para)-Mongolic? (Para)-Yeniseian? Turkic? language isolate?
- Dialects: Jie †; ?Hun †; Han-Zhao †; Xia †; Liang †; Yueban/Weak Xiongnu †
- Writing system: recorded with Chinese characters

Language codes
- ISO 639-3: None (mis)
- Glottolog: xion1234
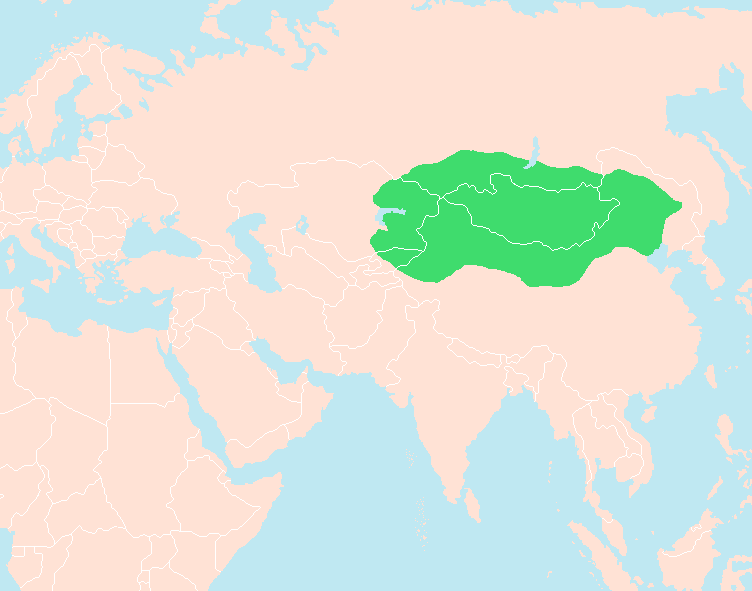
- Map of the Xiongnu Empire, where the Xiongnu language was spoken.

Xiongnu, also referred to as Xiong-nu or Hsiung-nu, is the language(s) presumed to be spoken by the Xiongnu, a people and confederation which existed from the 3rd century BCE to 100 AD. It is sparsely attested, and the extant material available on it comprises about 150 words, as well as what may be a two-line text transcribed using Chinese characters, which the Xiongnu may have used themselves for writing their language.

== Attestation ==
Apart from tribal and sovereign names, some words, a song in the potentially related Jie language, and Chinese descriptions, the language(s) of the Xiongnu is very poorly documented, and very fragmentarily attested.

== Classification ==
The origin of the Xiongnu is disputed and no theory has more support than another.

Xiongnu, with our current information, is unclassifiable or a language isolate, that is, a language whose relationship with another language is not apparent.

=== Turkic language ===
According to Savelyev and Jeong (2020): the "predominant part of the Xiongnu population is likely to have spoken Turkic" languages, even though comparative archaeogenetic analysis, of the remains of Xiongnu and other peoples, has suggested that they were likely multiethnic.

Wink (2002) suggests that the Xiongnu spoke an ancient form of Turkic, and if they were not Turkic themselves, that they were influenced by Turkic peoples.

Benjamin (2007) proposes that the Xiongnu were either Proto-Turks or Proto-Mongols, and that their language would have been similar to that of the Dingling.

According to Shubin Gong, a Turkic-dominant environment emerged in the Xiongnu territory through the progressive assimilation of Iranian-speaking populations.

Chinese historical works link the Xiongnu to various Turkic peoples:

- The ruling dynasty of the Göktürks were originally from northern tribes of the Xiongnu.
- The Book of Wei states that the Yueban (colloquially: "Weak Xiongnu") were descended from the northern Xiongnu.

The Book of Jin, listed Turkic tribe Chile as the fifth of 19 Southern Xiongnu tribes. By the time of the Rouran domination, the Gaoche comprised six tribes and twelve clans.

The Gaoche are probably remnants of the ancient Red Di. Initially they had been called Dili. Northerners take them as Chile. Chinese take them as Gaoche Dingling. Their language, in brief, and Xiongnu [language] are the same yet occasionally there are small differences. Or one may say that they [Gaoche] are the junior relatives of the Xiongnu in former times.

— Weishu, 103

The predecessors of Uyghur Khaganate were Xiongnu. Because, customarily, they ride high-wheeled carts. They were also called Gaoche during the Yuan Wei times, or also called Chile, mistakenly rendered as Tiele.

— Xin Tangshu, 232

The Luandi or Xulianti was the ruling clan of the Xiongnu that flourished from the 3rd century BCE to 4th century CE. The form Luandi comes from the Book of Han, while the form Xulianti comes from the Book of Later Han.

Lanhai Wei and Hui Li reconstruct the Old Chinese pronunciation of 挛鞮 as *lyuan-tlïγ, evolving from an earlier 虚连题 (*Hala-yundluγ), as a result of a historical sound shift involving the initial dropping of *h- by demonstrating its occurrence in several historical sources. Furthermore, the conjugation of the roots *hala, meaning colorful; *yund meaning horse, *-luγ as the participle suffix would have resulted in the semantic meaning "tribe with skewbald horses" in an early Turkic dialect, allowing it to be further identified with the historical Ulayundluğ tribe. Moreover, the authors argue that the conquest of the same clan by the Xue in the 4th century CE eventually gave birth to the Xueyantuo.

According to the Book of Wei, the Yuebans' language and customs were the same as the Gaoche.

The Tongdian records the origin of Yantuo: "During the reign of Murong Jun in the Former Yan, the Xiongnu chanyu Helatou (賀剌頭, "the leader of the Alat tribe") led his tribe of thirty-five thousand people and came to surrender. Yantuo people are probably their descendants." Based on this, Bao (2010) proposed that Yantuo people were the descendants of the Alat tribe, also known as Hala-Yundluɣ; therefore, the name Yantuo was probably derived from Yundluɣ, and Xueyantuo can be reconstructed as Sir-Yundluɣ.

=== (Para-)Yeniseian language ===
In the 20th century, Lajos Ligeti was the first linguist to hypothesize on the Yeniseian origin of the Xiongnu language. In the early 1960s, Edwin Pulleyblank further developed this theory and added evidence.

The Yeniseian origin theory proposes that the Jie, a Western Xiongnu people, were Yeniseians. Hyun Jin Kim found similarities in a Jie-language song in the Book of Jin (composed during the 7th century) to Yeniseian. Pulleyblank and Vovin then affirmed that the Jie were the minority ruling class of the Xiongnu, ruling over the other Turkic and Iranian groups.

According to Kim, the dominant language of the Xiongnu was likely Turkic or Yeniseian, but their empire was multiethnic.

It is possible that Xiongnu nobility titles originated from Yeniseian and were loaned into Turkic and Serbi-Mongolic languages:

- The words "tarqan", "tegin", and "kaghan" originate from Xiongnu, and they may therefore have a Yeniseian origin.
- The Xiongnu word for "heaven" may be derived from Proto-Yeniseian *tɨŋVr.

Certain Xiongnu words appear to be cognate with Yeniseian:

- Xiongnu kʷala "son" compared to Ket qalek "younger son".
- Xiongnu sakdak "boot" compared to Ket sagdi "boot".
- Xiongnu gʷawa "prince" compared to Ket gij "prince".
- Xiongnu dar "north" compared to Yugh tɨr "north"
- Xiongnu dijʔ-ga "clarified butter" compared to Ket tik "clear"

According to Pulleyblank, the consonant cluster /rl/ appears word-initially in certain Xiongnu words. This indicates that Xiongnu may not have a Turkic origin. Most of the attested vocabulary also appears Yeniseian in nature.

Vovin remarks that certain horse names in Xiongnu appear to be Turkic with Yeniseian prefixes.

It is also possible that Xiongnu is linked to Yeniseian in a Para-Yeniseian phylum, both linked in a Xiongnu-Yeniseian family, but others believe it was a Southern Yeniseian language.

As a result, there are two competing models for the classification of Xiongnu into Yeniseian:

==== Yeniseian model ====
Yeniseian languages
  - Northern Yeniseian
  - Southern Yeniseian
    - Assanic
    - Pumpokolic
    - Xiongnu

==== Para-Yeniseian model ====
Xiongnu-Yeniseian
  - Yeniseian
  - Para-Yeniseian
    - Xiongnu
    - ?

A 2025 paper claims that, based on analysis of the limited Xiongnu lexicon and the only extant text of the Jie language, that the Xiongnu language is related to the Arin language, which went extinct in the 18th century.

=== (Para-)Mongolic language ===
Certain linguists posit that the Xiongnu spoke a language similar to Mongolic. According to some Mongolian archaeologists, the people of the slab-grave culture were the ancestors of the Xiongnu, and some scholars believe the Xiongnu were the ancestors of Mongols.

According to Bichurin, the Xianbei and the Xiongnu were the same people, just with different states.

The Book of Wei indicates that the Rouanrouans were descendants of the Donghu. The Book of Liang adds:

They [the Rouanrouans] also constituted a branch of the Xiongnu.

Ancient Chinese sources also designate various nomadic peoples to be the ancestors of the Xiongnu:

- The Kumo Xi, speakers of a Para-Mongolic language
- The Göktürks, who spoke the Orkhon Turkic language (or Göktürk), a Siberian Turkic language.
- The Tiele, who also spoke Turkic.

Other elements seem to indicate a Mongolic or Serbi-Mongolic origin of the Xiongnu:

- Genghis Khan designated the era of Modu Chanyu, in a letter addressed to the Taoist Qiu Chuji, as "the bygone times of our Chanyu".
- Xiongnu solar and lunar symbols resemble the Mongolic Soyombo symbol.

=== Iranian language ===
Beckwith suggests that the name "Xiongnu" is cognate with the word "Scythian", or "Saka", or "Sogdian" (all referring to Central Iranian peoples). According to him, the Iranians directed the Xiongnu and influenced their culture and models.

János Harmatta interprets Xiongnu royal and tribal names as deriving from an Eastern Iranian (Saka-type) language, and states this indicates a significant Eastern Iranian-speaking component within the Xiongnu polity. According to Alexander Savelyev and Choongwoon Jeong, ancient Iranians contributed significantly to Xiongnu culture. Additionally, genetic studies indicate that 5% to 25% of Xiongnu were of Iranian origin.

=== Other possible origins ===
Other, less developed, hypotheses posit that Xiongnu is of Finno-Ugric or Sino-Tibetan affiliation. It is possible that some eastern Xiongnu peoples may have spoken a Koreanic language.

==== Multiple languages ====
A more developed and supported hypothesis than the previous ones indicate a multiethnic origin, and the primary language of the Xiongnu would be too poorly attested to conclude a relationship to any other language.

=== Possible link with Hunnic ===
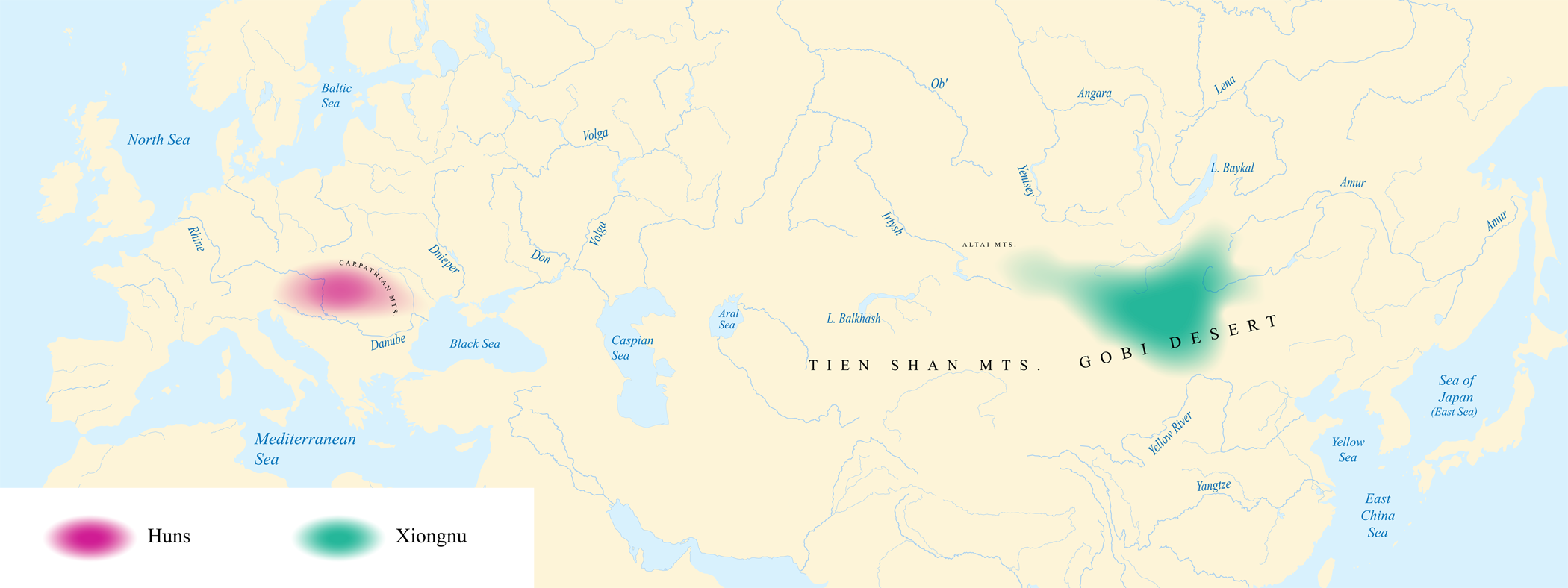
Geographical location of the Xiongnu empire and the later heartland of the Huns in Europe.

Some researchers suggest a linguistic connection between the Huns, Hunas, and the Xiongnu people, There is no consensus about the linguistic origins of the Huns. As with the Xiongnu, some scholars have suggested that the Huns originated from Mongolic or Turkic speaking groups. There are likewise suggestions that Hunnic (or Hunnish) was originally a Yeniseian language, or the result of hybridisation with such a language. It is also possible that the Huns originated from Indo-European peoples. For instance, it has been suggested that because the Huns had significantly interacted with Eastern Iranian-speaking tribes in Transoxiana and Bactria, they may have adopted the Kushan-Bactrian language.

== Contact with Chinese ==
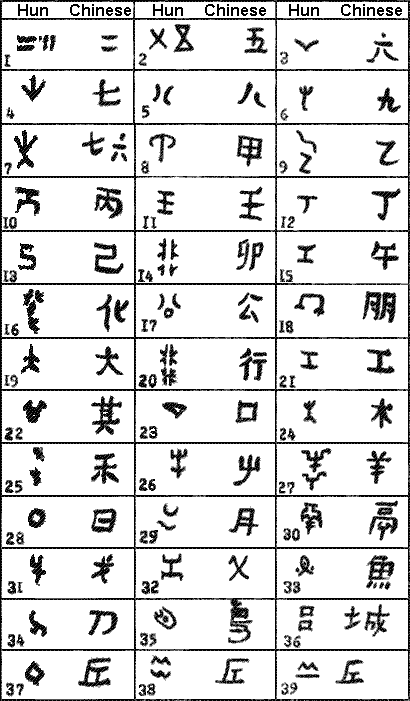
2nd century BC – 2nd century AD characters of Xiongnu-Xianbei script (Mongolia and Inner Mongolia).

The Xiongnu had mutual contact with the Chinese civilization, and the Chinese were their sole contact with the outside world besides the tribes around them which they were the dominating force above them. In 53 BC, Huhanye (呼韓邪) decided to enter into tributary relations with Han China. The original terms insisted on by the Han court were that, first, the Chanyu or his representatives should come to the capital to pay homage; secondly, the Chanyu should send a hostage prince; and thirdly, the Chanyu should present tribute to the Han emperor. The political status of the Xiongnu in the Chinese world order was reduced from that of a "brotherly state" to that of an "outer vassal" (外臣). One of the most significant inscriptions in the Xiongnu language, found in the Xiongnu capital Longcheng, was written in Chinese characters and spell out *darƣʷa, meaning "leader" or "chief". There also were a Xiongnu inscription unearthed in Buryatia that has Chinese characters written on it, suggesting that Chinese alphabet was in usage in the area of this is result of Han influence via trade networks. Another inscription that uses Chinese characters is located in the royal tomb complex of the Xiongnu that spells out:

[乘輿][...] [...] [...]年考工工賞造 嗇夫臣康掾臣安主右丞臣 [...] [...]令臣[...]護工卒史臣尊省,

It translates:

[Fit for use by the emperor] made in the [?] year of the [? era] by the master artisan of the Kaogong imperial workshop Shang. Managed by the workshop overseer, your servant Kang; the lacquer bureau head, your servant An. Inspected by the Assistant Director of the Right, your servant [?]; the Director, your servant [?]; and the Commandery Clerk for Workshop Inspection, your servant Zun.

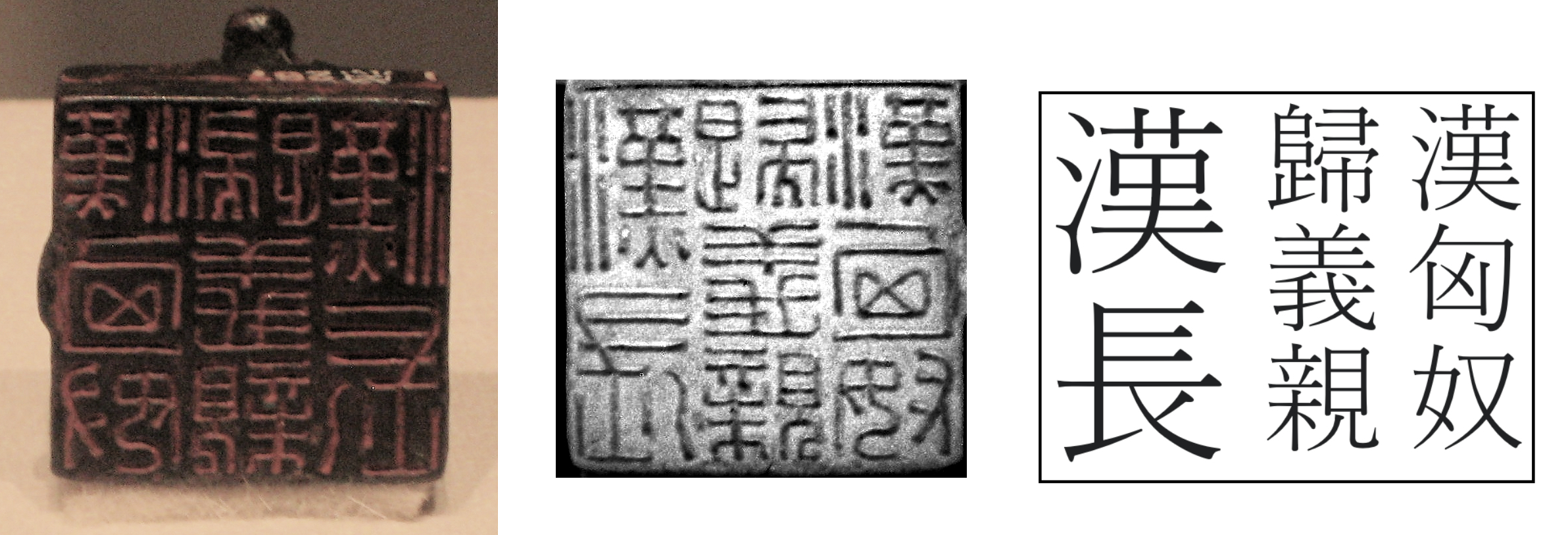
Bronze seal of a Xiongnu chief, conferred by the Eastern Han government. Inscribed 漢匈奴/歸義親/漢長 ("The Chief of the Han Xiongnu, who have returned to righteousness and embraced the Han"). Seal, impression, and transcription in standard characters.

Xiongnu influence in the Chinese language includes the Chinese word for lipstick (胭脂) which spells out as jentsye and derives from the Xiongnu word for wife (閼氏) which is spelled out in the same manner. Several terms in animal husbandry, including names for different species of horses and camels that have uncertain foreign-originating etymologies, also had been suggested to have Xiongnu origins. The name of the Qilian Mountains also originates from Xiongnu. A Xiongnu deity named Jinglu (徑路) was depicted as a sword and the spelling is the same as the Chinese word for "path" or "way". This deity had a temple dedicated to him and the worship included carving gold using the holy knife.

After the dissolution of the Xiongnu, a few tribes remained to exist, which were the tribes of Chuge, Tiefu, Lushuihu, and Yueban. Except for the Yueban, also called the Weak Xiongnu, the rest of the tribes migrated to China and started their own settlements. One of those unique settlements is Tongwancheng, which has a mixed Xiongnu and Chinese etymology, specifically 統萬 (tongwan), a possible cognate with the word tümen which exists in both Turkic and Mongolian, meaning "leading 10,000" or "leading a myriad".

== See also ==
- Huns
- Para-Yeniseian languages
- Proto-Mongols
- Kayı (tribe)

== Bibliography ==
- Ts. Baasansuren (Summer 2010). "The Scholar Who Showed the True Mongolia to the World". Mongolica. 6 (14). pp. 40
- Harold W. Bailey (1985). Indo-Scythian Studies: being Khotanese Texts. Cambridge University Press. JSTOR 312539.
- Beckwith, Christopher I. (16 March 2009). Empires of the Silk Road: A History of Central Eurasia from the Bronze Age to the Present. Princeton University Press. ISBN 978-0-691-13589-2.
- N. Bichurin (1950). Collection of information on the peoples who inhabited Central Asia in ancient times.
- Di Cosmo, Nicola (2004). Ancient China and its Enemies: The Rise of Nomadic Power in East Asian History. Cambridge University Press.
- Shimin Geng (2005). 阿尔泰共同语、匈奴语探讨 (in Chinese). 语言与翻译. ISSN 1001-0823. OCLC 123501525. Archived from the original on 2012-02-25.
- Peter B. Golden (1992). "Chapter VI – The Uyğur Qağante (742–840)".". An Introduction to the History of the Turkic Peoples: Ethnogenesis and State-Formation in Medieval and Early Modern Eurasia and the Middle East. Wiesbaden: O. Harrassowitz. ISBN 978-3-447-03274-2.
- Peter B. Golden (2013). Some Notes on the Avars and Rouran. Iași: Curta, Maleon.
- Peter B. Golden (August 2018). The Ethnogonic Tales of the Türks. The Medieval History Journal.
- Harmatta, János (1994). History of Civilizations of Central Asia: The Development of Sedentary and Nomadic Civilizations, 700 B. C. to A. D. 250. UNESCO. ISBN 978-9231028465.
- Andreas Hölzl (2018). A typology of questions in Northeast Asia and beyond. Martin Haspelmath. p. 532. doi:10.5281/zenodo.1344467. ISBN 978-3-96110-102-3. ISSN 2363-5568.
- Huang Yungzhi; Li Hui (2017). The genetic and linguistic evidence for the Xiongnu-Yenisseian hypothesis (PDF). Man in India.
- Hyun Jin Kim (2013). The Huns, Rome and the Birth of Europe. Cambridge University Press. ISBN 978-1-107-00906-6.
- Hyun Jin Kim (November 2015). The Huns. Taylor & Francis. ISBN 978-1317340904.
- Joo-Yup Lee (2016). The Historical Meaning of the Term Turk and the Nature of the Turkic Identity of the Chinggisid and Timurid Elites in Post-Mongol Central Asia. Central Asiatic Journal.
- Savelyev, Alexander; Jeong, Choongwoon (7 May 2020). "Early nomads of the Eastern Steppe and their tentative connections in the West". Evolutionary Human Sciences. 2. doi:10.1017/ehs.2020.18. hdl:21.11116/0000-0007-772B-4. PMC 7612788. PMID 35663512.
- Denis Sinor. Aspects of Altaic Civilization III.
- D. Tumen (February 2011). Anthropology of Archaeological Populations from Northeast Asia (PDF). Dankook: Oriental Studies. Archived from the original (PDF) on 2013-07-29.
- Vovin, Alexander (2000). "Did the Xiong-nu speak a Yeniseian language?". Central Asiatic Journal. 44 (1): 87–104. JSTOR 41928223.
- Vovin, Alexander (2003). Did the Xiongnu speak a Yeniseian language? Part 2: Vocabulary. Altaica Budapestinensia MMII.
- Vovin, Alexander; Edward Vajda; Étienne de la Vaissière (2016). Who were the *Kjet (羯) and what language did they speak?. Journal Asiatique.
- Vovin, Alexander (2015). ONCE AGAIN ON THE ETYMOLOGY OF THE TITLE qaγan. Cracovie: Studia Etymologica Cracoviensia.
- A. Wink (2002). Al-Hind: making of the Indo-Islamic World. Brill. ISBN 0-391-04174-6.
- Xumeng, Sun (14 September 2020). Identifying the Huns and the Xiongnu (or Not): Multi-Faceted Implications and Difficulties (PDF). PRISM: University of Calgary's Digital Repository (Thesis).
- Ying-Shih Yü (1990). The Hsiung-Nu. Cambridge: Cambridge University Press.
