= Karasuk languages =

Hypothetical Asian language family

Karasuk
- Burusho-Yeniseian
- (controversial)
- Geographic distribution: Central Siberia and northern Pakistan
- Linguistic classification: Proposed language family
- Subdivisions: Yeniseian; Burushaski

Language codes
- Glottolog: None
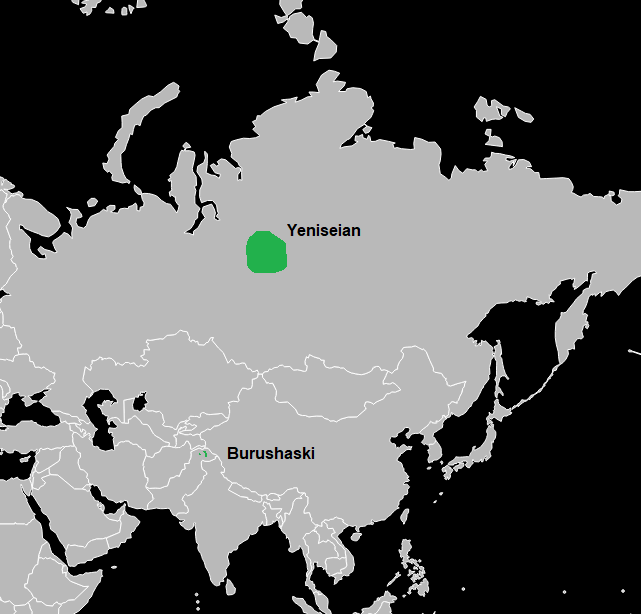
- Modern distribution of Karasuk languages

Karasuk is a hypothetical language family that links the Yeniseian languages of central Siberia with the Burushaski language of northern Pakistan.

== History of proposals ==
Hyde Clarke (1870) first noted a possible connection between the Yeniseian and Burushaski languages.

The name Karasuk was proposed by George van Driem of the University of Leiden. The family is named after the Karasuk culture, which existed in Central Asia during the Bronze Age in second millennium BCE. Van Driem postulates the Burusho people took part in the Indo-Aryan migration out of Central Asia and into the northern part of Pakistan, while other Karasuk peoples migrated northwards to become the Yeniseians. These claims have been picked up by anthropologist and linguist Roger Blench (1999).

Václav Blažek (2019) places the linguistic homeland of Proto-Yeniseian close to where Burushaski is now spoken today in Pakistan. He argues that based on hydronomic evidence, Yeniseian languages were originally spoken on the northern slopes of the Tianshan and Pamir mountains before dispersing downstream via the Irtysh River.

== Morphological evidence ==
The evidence for Karasuk is mostly in the verbal and nominal morphology. For example, the second-person singular prefixes on intransitive verbs are [ɡu-, ɡó-] in Burushaski and [ku-, ɡu-] in Ket. Ket has two verbal declensions, one prefixed with d- and one with b-, and Burushaski likewise has two, one prefixed with d- and one without such a marker. However, neither the Burushaski nor the Yeniseian verbal morphology has been rigorously analysed, and reviewers have found the evidence to be weak.

While Yeniseian has been proposed to be related to the Na-Dené languages of North America, as part of a newly named Dené–Yeniseian family, the relevant morphological correspondences between Na-Dené and Yeniseian have not been found in Burushaski.

== Lexical cognates ==
Below is a list of possible cognates:

Suggested cognates
Proto-Yeniseian	Burushaski	English
*binč	melc	chin/jaw
*siː	si/su	eat
*seŋ	sán	liver/spleen
*ʔig	yek	name
*qoʎ	qʌt	armpit
*təga	ʔ(r)ək	breast/chest
*pʌx	pak	clean
*dʌr	thɛr	dirt/dirty

Kassian and Starostin (2017) list the following potential cognates between Proto-Yeniseian and Proto-Burushaski.

gloss	Proto-Yeniseian	Proto-Burushaski
‘dry’	*qɔɢ-	*qaq-
‘to eat’	*siː-	*ʂi-
‘to give’	*=o	*=u-
‘to kill’	*xeːy	*=s=ʁa-
‘name’	*ʔiɢ	*ek
‘that’	*ʔu, *ʔa	*i-
‘eye’	*de-s	*=l-ɕi
‘I’	*ʔaʒ	*ʓa
‘leaf’	*yəːpe	*ƛap
‘root’	*ciːǯ	*cʰereʂ
‘thou’	*ʔaw	*un
