= Yeniseian peoples =

Indigenous peoples of Central Siberia in Russia

Yeniseians
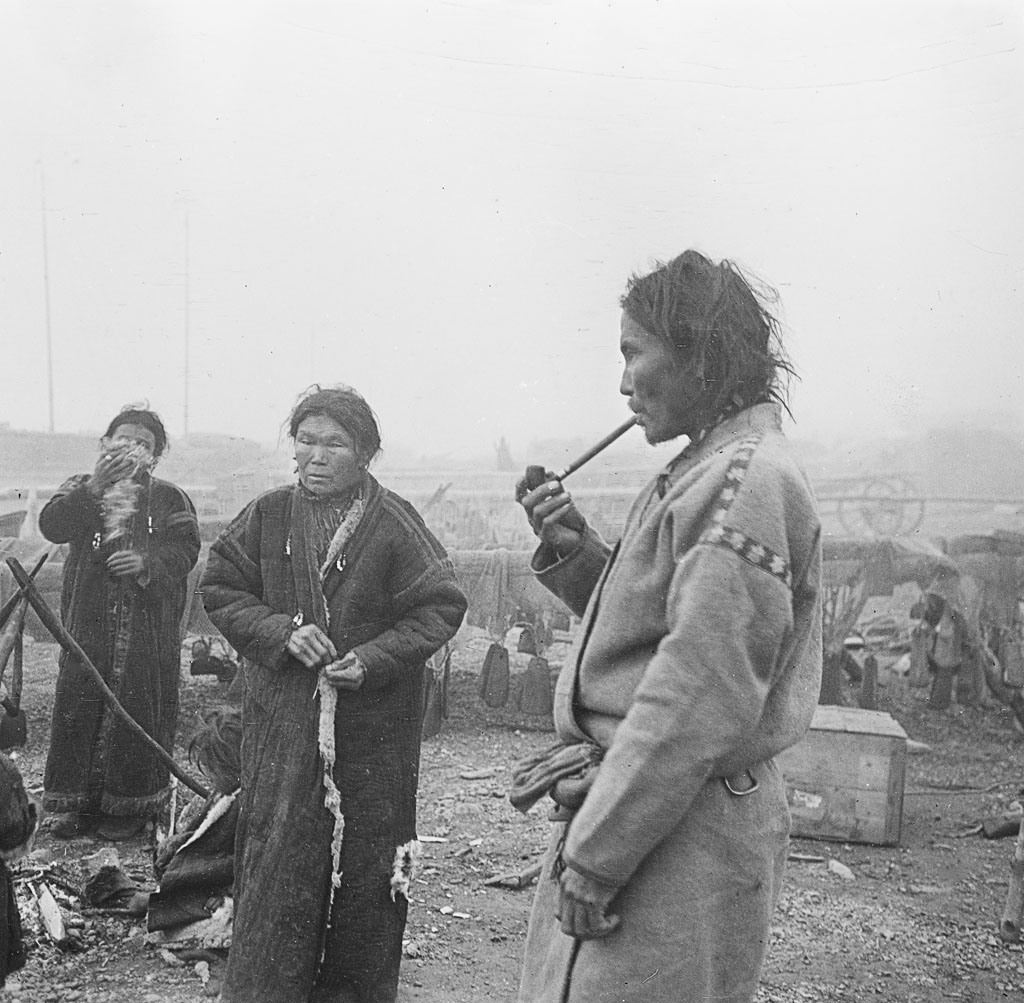
- Ket people, 1913.

Total population
- 1,095 (2021)

Languages
- Yeniseian languages, Russian

Religion
- Shamanism (formerly)

Related ethnic groups
- Paleo-Eskimos, Indigenous peoples of the Americas, especially Na-Dene peoples, Siberian Tatars, Selkups, possibly Xiongnu, Huns, and Jie people

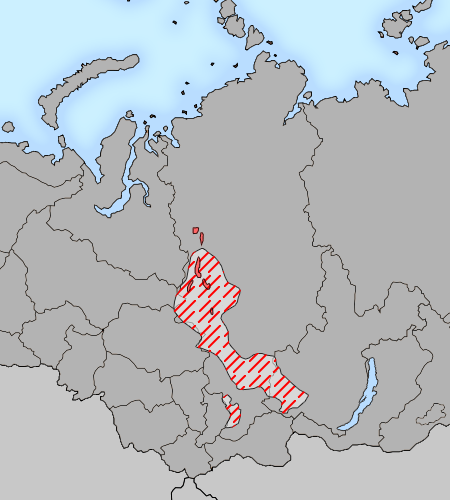
Distribution of the Yeniseian languages based on Russian historical data. This likely represents a northward migration of the Yeniseians from their origin in Northern Mongolia.

The Yeniseian people refers either to the modern or ancient Siberian populations speaking Yeniseian languages. Despite evidence pointing to the historical presence of Yeniseian populations throughout Siberia and Northern Mongolia, only the Ket and Yugh people survive today. The modern Yeniseians live along the eastern middle stretch of the Yenisei River in the Central Siberia. According to the 2021 census, there were 1,088 Kets and 7 Yughs in Russia.

Based on hydronymic data, the Yeniseians originated from the area around the Sayan Mountains and the southern tip of Lake Baikal. The known historical distribution of the Yeniseians is likely to represent a northward migration, with the modern-day Kets representing the very northernmost expansion of the language family. This migration possibly occurred as a result of the fall of the Xiongnu confederation, which, according to Alexander Vovin, is likely to have been Yeniseian-speaking, with their language being most closely related to Arin. The Jie people, a branch of the Xiongnu who established the Later Zhao state in China, are likely to have spoken a variant of Yeniseian close to Pumpokol.

With the proposal of the Dené–Yeniseian language family, the Yeniseians have been linked to Native Americans, particularly the Athabaskans. It has been suggested that the Yeniseians represent either a back-migration from the Bering land bridge to Central Siberia, or that early Dene-Yeniseian speakers originated in Central Siberia, with Na-Dene speakers expanding into the Americas while Yeniseian speakers remained in Siberia.

According to the toponymic evidence, prior to the 17th century Yeniseians occupied vast territories of Western and Central Siberia, from northern Mongolia in the south to the middle Yenisei river in the north, and from the Irtysh river in the west to Angara river in the east.

== History ==
Not much is known about the history of the Yeniseian peoples. The Yeniseians were likely part of the Xiongnu confederation and were possibly associated with its ruling elite. It has also been suggested that they played an important role in the formation of the Hunnic Empire. The Jie people, possibly having some relation to ancient Yeniseians, created the Later Zhao dynasty of northern China. Based on linguistic records, they are considered to be a Pumpokolic tribe, a theory supported by evidence of long-term Pumpokolic inhabitation in northern Mongolia based on toponyms. After some time, they were defeated and assimilated into the wider Han society. Like the Jie people, most other Yeniseian-speaking groups were assimilated into other ethnicities, most notably Turkic and Mongolic peoples.

By the time of the Russian conquest of Siberia, only six remaining Yeniseian languages could be documented: the northern Ket and Yugh, the southern Kott and Assan, and the central Arin and Pumpokol languages. Edward Vajda has proposed that, based on hydronymic analysis, the distribution of Yeniseians, as recorded by the Russians, represents a recent northward migration of the Yeniseians deep into Siberia, in the process abandoning their original homeland in northern Mongolia and south Siberia close to Lake Baikal. This is based on the observation that while river names in the circumpolar region (the modern distribution of Yeniseians) are of Turkic, Mongolic, Ugric, or Tungusic origin, those in the area south of Lake Baikal clearly have Yeniseian origins. Indeed, Russian sources record that even after the 17th century, the Ket were continuing to expand northward down the Yenisei River, and the modern Ket-speaking area appears to be representative of the northernmost reaches of Yeniseian migration.

Eventually, most of these languages surviving into the 17th century also went extinct, with the Kott-Yugh undergoing a language shift to Khakas, and the Arin-Pumpokol shifting to either Khakas or Chulym Tatar. The last remnants of the Yeniseians are the Ket and Yugh people; the first of them are a recognized minority group in Russia. Many younger Kets are now abandoning their language in favour of Russian.

The term "Yeniseian" was first used by Julius Klaproth in 1823 to collectively describe the Arins, Assans, Kets, Kotts, Pumpokols and Yughs.

It was first proposed by Edward Vajda that Yeniseians are directly related to certain Native Americans. Specifically, the Yeniseians are thought to be closely related to the Na-Dene populations of Canada and Alaska. While some have suggested that the Yeniseians and the Na-Dene may be the result of a radiation out of Beringia, with the Yeniseians representing a back-migration into central Siberia from the Bering land bridge, increasing evidence support a Central-South Siberian origin for both Yeniseians and Na-Dene speakers, possibly as part of the proposed Dené–Yeniseian family.

== Ethnic groups ==
=== Modern ===
The two remaining Yeniseian ethnic groups include the Ket people and the Yugh people.

=== Historical ===
The Yeniseians included a variety of extinct ethnic groups:

- The Asan or Assan were a Yeniseian speaking people in Siberia. In the 18th and 19th centuries they were assimilated by the Evenks. They spoke the Assan language.
- The Kott people were a Yeniseian-speaking people in Siberia. They were closely related to the Asan people (who are also extinct). They spoke the Kott language which went extinct in the mid-1800s along with the ethnicity. They referred to themselves as kottuen (singular kotu) along with the Assans.
- The Pumpokol people (Gebéŋ) and Arin people (Ar/Ara) were also Yeniseian-speaking.
- The Xiongnu.
- The Huns.
- The historical Jie tribe of the Xiongnu are thought to have been either Turkic or Yeniseian.

== Languages ==
Yeniseian languages are considered a language isolate as they are unrelated to any known language families from the so-called Old World. In recent years there have been proposals to include them in a hypothetical Dené–Yeniseian language family, as Yeniseian languages might be distantly related to Na-Dené languages of North America.

The Yeniseian language family is an endangered family with only one surviving branch. The Ket language, the very northernmost Yeniseian language, has only about 153 native speakers as of 2020. Kellog in Russia is the only place where Ket is still taught in schools. Special books are provided for grades second through fourth but after those grades there is only Russian literature to read that describes Ket culture. There are no known monolingual speakers for now.

Despite this, Yeniseian languages played a significant role in Chinese, Mongolian, and Central Asian history. Both the ruling elite of the Xiongnu and that of the Later Zhao dynasty appear to have spoken, at least partially, Yeniseic. It has been suggested that the part of the Xiongnu underwent a linguistic shift from Yeniseian to Turkic. According to Jingyi Gao (2014) lexical similarities between the Hungarian language and the Yeniseian languages may point to a Yeniseian presence within the Hun confederation, and a possible Hunnic substratum among Hungarian.

Many recognisable Turkic and Mongolic words, such as the royal titles Khan, Khagan, and Tarqan, and the word for "sky" and later "god", Tengri, may be loanwords from Yeniseian. Tengri in particular has been derived from proto-Yeniseian *tɨŋVr by linguist Stefan Georg, in an analysis praised as "excellent" by Alexander Vovin.

== Genetics ==
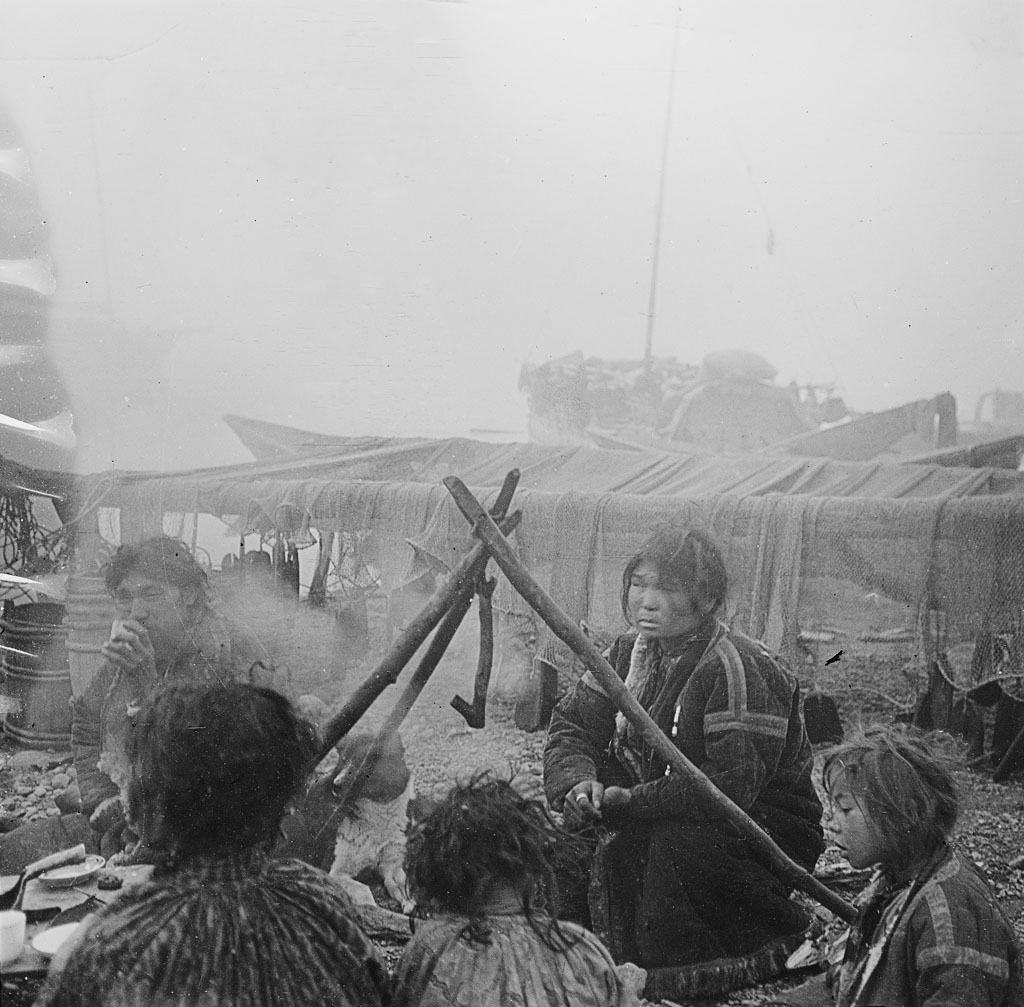
Yeniseian Ket fisher folk in 1913. Photographer: Fridtjof Nansen

The Yeniseians appear closely related to other Indigenous Siberians and Native Americans. They display a high frequency of paternal haplogroup Q-M242.

According to a 2016 study, the Ket and other Yeniseian people originated likely somewhere near the Altai Mountains or near Lake Baikal. It is suggested that parts of the Altaians are predominantly of Yeniseian origin and closely related to the Ket people. The Ket people are also closely related to several Native American groups. According to this study, the Yeniseians are linked to the Paleo-Eskimo groups.

The ancestors of Yeniseian peoples may have been related to the Syalakh culture of ancient Yakutia. Yeniseian people, specifically Ket, also show high amounts of affinity towards Tuvans and other peoples of Siberia, suggesting that Yeniseian ancestry can be linked to Paleo-Siberians, which replaced previous Upper-Paleolithic Siberians (Ancient North Eurasian) as the dominant population, and were subsequently largely assimilated by Neo-Siberians from Northeast Asia.

Ancient Yeniseian speakers can be associated with a Late Neolithic/Bronze Age ancestry in the Baikal area (Cisbaikal_LNBA or Baikal_EBA) maximized among hunter-gatherers of the local Glazkovo culture. They can be differentiated from the earlier 'Early Neolithic Baikal hunter-gatherers' associated with the Kitoi and Fofonovo cultures (Baikal_EN) and later Amur-derived (DevilsCave_N-like) groups. Cisbaikal_LNBA ancestry is inferred to be rich in Ancient Paleo-Siberian ancestry, and also display affinity to Inner Northeast Asian (Yumin-like) groups. This type of ancestry has also been observed among Eastern Scythians (Saka) and made up nearly all of the ancestry (85-95%) from an outlier sample of the Karasuk culture (RISE497). Cisbaikal_LNBA ancestry later spread together with Glazkovo-type pottery to the forest zone of the Middle Angara, correlating with the supposed dispersal of Yeniseian languages, supporting a homeland in the Cis-Baikal region. Cisbaikal_LNBA has also been found at low amounts among Athabaskan speakers, lending support to the Dene-Yeniseian hypothesis.

According to some researchers, the Yeniseian people are a result of reverse migration (from America to Asia).

While modern-day Kets are derived from a Cisbaikal_LNBA-like source, they also display significant amounts of geneflow from Uralic-affiliated (Yakutia_LNBA) sources.
