= Pumpokolic languages =

Extinct branch of Yeniseian languages

Pumpokolic
- Arin-Pumpokol
- Geographic distribution: Yenisey, possibly also northeast China
- Ethnicity: Pumpokol, Jie
- Linguistic classification: Dené–Yeniseian?: Yeniseian; Pumpokolic
- Subdivisions: Pumpokol †; ?Jie †; ?Arin †

Language codes
- Glottolog: arin1242 Arin-Pumpokol
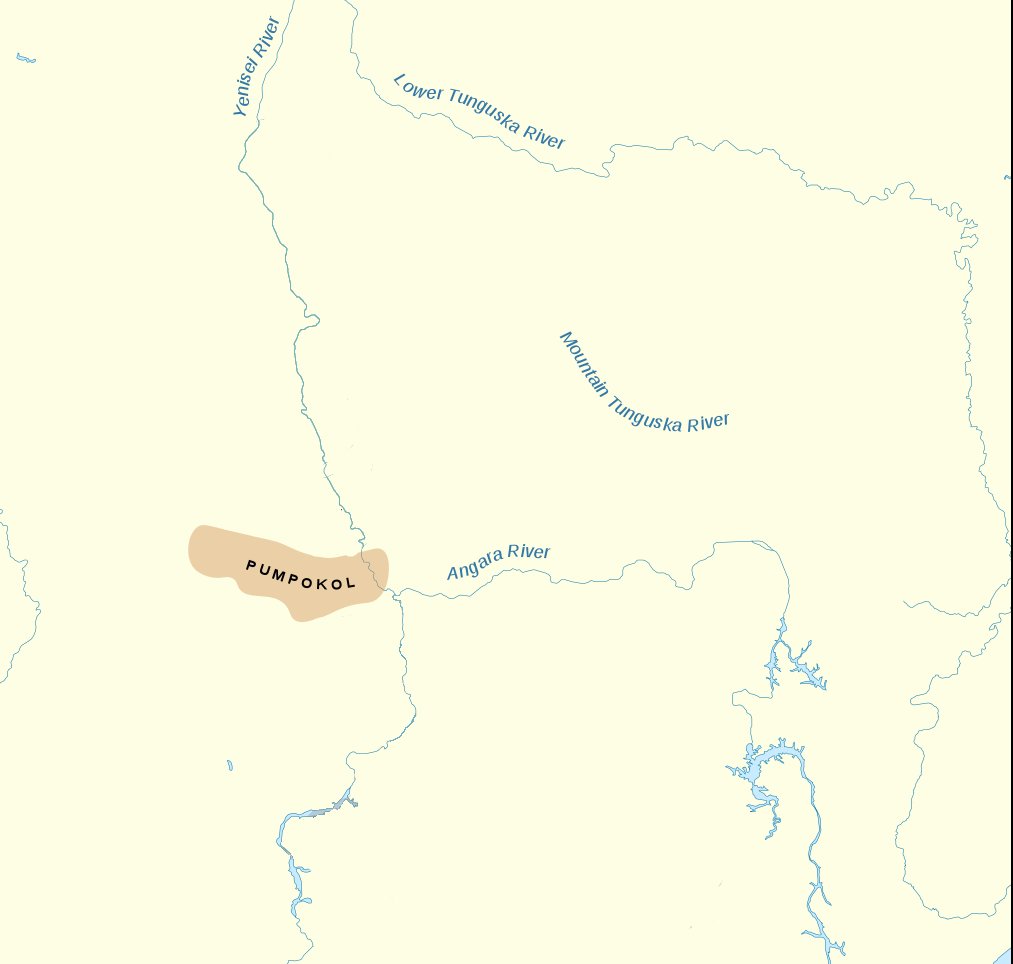
- Pre-contact distribution of Pumpokol.

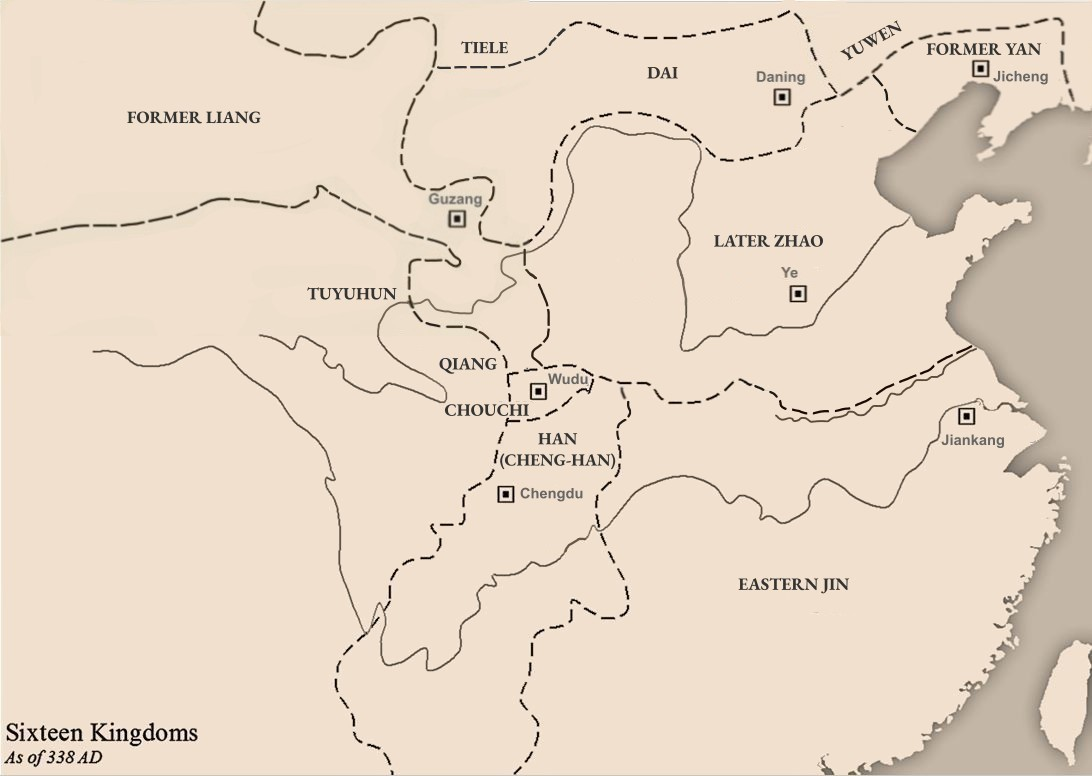
- Map of Sixteen Kingdoms in year 338, showing the Later Zhao, a state ruled by the Jie.

The Pumpokolic languages (also known as the Arin-Pumpokol, depending on classification or Pumpolic languages) form one of the principal subgroups of the Yeniseian languages. All constituent languages are now extinct.

== Classification ==
The classification of this group is debated. Most classify Arin and Pumpokol (and eventually Jie) in a Southern Yeniseian subgroup, but more recently linguists have placed Arin in its separate Arinic branch (sometimes placed as a subgroup of Southern Yeniseian), and classify Pumpokol(ic) as a separate branch of Yeniseian.

=== Arin-Pumpokol model ===
Yeniseian
  - Northern
  - Southern
    - Kott-Assan
    - Arin-Pumpokol
      - Arin
      - Pumpokol
      - (Jie)

=== Split Arinic/Pumpokolic model ===
This model is used in Vajda 2024.

Yeniseian
  - Yenisei-Ostyak
  - Kottic
  - Arinic
    - Arin
  - Pumpokolic
    - Jie?
    - Pumpokolic

=== Southern Yeniseian model ===
This model was introduced in Georg 2007 and used in Hölzl 2018.

Yeniseian
  - Northern
  - Pumpokol
  - Southern
    - Assan-Kott
    - Arin

== History ==
According to the Southern Yeniseian theory, Pumpokolic may have split from Yeniseian around the 9th century BCE, and would have extended southward to China in the 4th century (Melas (2022). Arin and Pumpokol are then posited to have separated in the 6th century. Arin is believed to have gone extinct in the 1730s and Pumpokol around the early 18th century.

== See also ==
- Jie people

== Bibliography ==
- Alexander Vovin (2000). Did the Xiongnu speak a Yeniseian language?. Central Asiatic Journal.
- Hölzl, Andreas (29 August 2018). A typology of questions in Northeast Asia and beyond. Studies in Diversity Linguistics. ISBN 978-3-96110-102-3.
- Carlos Quiles (23 April 2021). Proto-Yeniseian Homeland. Indo-European.eu.
- Edward Vajda; Michael D. Fortescue (31 January 2022). Mid-holocene language connections between Asia and North America. Leiden: Brill. ISBN 9789004436824. OCLC 1298393170.
- Edwin George Pulleyblank (1963). The consonantal system of Old Chinese. Part II (PDF). Asia Major.
