= Abakan palace ruins =

Remains of Chinese architecture in Russia

The Abakan palace ruins (simplified Chinese: 阿巴坎遗址; traditional Chinese: 阿巴坎遺址; Russian: Ташебинский дворец) are the remains of a Chinese architecture styled palace found near Abakan, Khakassia, Russia, dating back more than 2,000 years ago to the Chinese Han dynasty. It was excavated by Russian archaeologists. The palace was administered by the Xiongnu and the Han dynasty in the old Jiankun region of China. It is about 1,000 kilometres (600 mi) west of the modern Buryat city of Ulan-Ude. Various other nomadic tribes have lived here like the modern Yenisei and ancient Dingling (Baikal lake). Some believe it may be a palace for Li Ling and his Xiongnu wife. Others contend it was actually Lú Fāng's (卢芳) palace.
