= Arin people =

Arins
Arin: ar, ara

Total population
- merged with Khakas (Kachin subgroup) and Russians

Regions with significant populations
- middle Yenisey

Languages
- Khakas language (Kachin dialect), Russian language, formerly Arin

Related ethnic groups
- other Yeniseian peoples

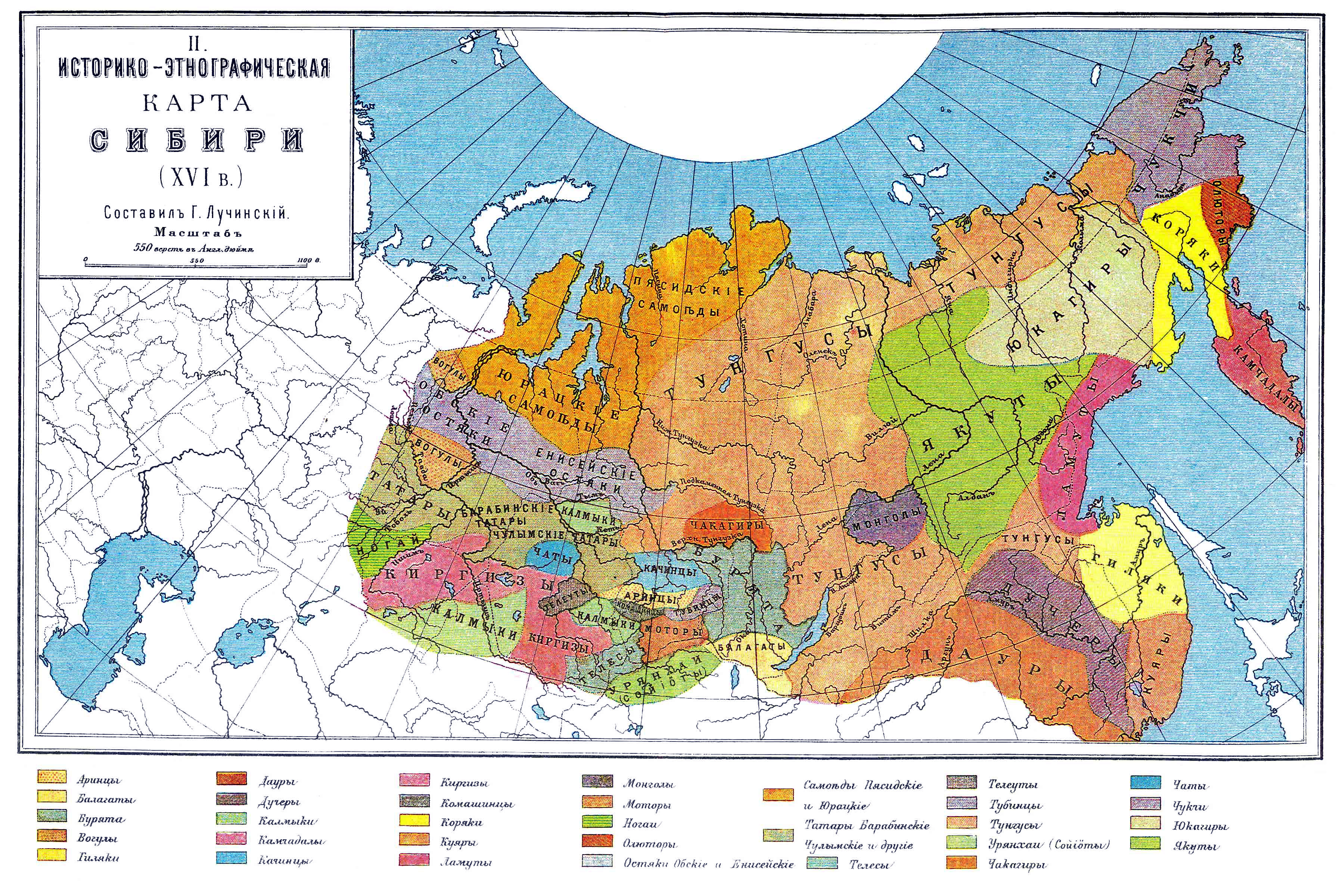
Arins

The Arins were a Yeniseian people, part of the peoples sometimes called Ostyaks. By mixing and Russification, they were assimilated by the 19th century. Today, they are a seok of the Khakas.

== Origins ==
The Arins appear to have an ancient south Siberian origin, as evidenced by their development of blacksmithing, like other southern tribes of the Iron Age. According to Gerhard Friedrich Müller, the name 'Arin' originates from Turkic ара 'wasp'. In Khakas folklore, the Arins were strong and powerful, originating from Gora Karaul'naya (Yenisei Kyrgyz, Khakas: Kum-Tigey), today a part of Krasnoyarsk. They attacked and killed many people in the manner of a swarm of wasps, hence the name. A legend tells of their massacre of snakes near Mount Kum-Tigey, after which Chylan Khan (Khakas: Чылан-хан), the Snake King, nearly exterminated the Arins. A story telling the demise of the Scythians after a fight with snakes in the history of Herodotus bears similarities with the one about the Arins.

== History ==
The Arins, along with the closely related Yastins, lived nomadically around modern Krasnoyarsk, also inhabiting Sukhobuzimsky District, Yemelyanovsky District and further west to the Kemchug river. They revered Kum-Tigey, as it was their ancestral mountain. Already in the 17th-18th century, the Arins were mentioned as a disappearing ethnic group. After the foundation of Krasnoyarsk Fortress in 1628, the Arins, then numbering 640, had their traditional territory reduced. They then, with the Kachins, formed a suburban yasak land, under the common name of "Krasnoyarsk Tatars". The Arins who inhabited this land were cattle breeders and farmers, and did not differ in appearance, way of life, economy and social organization. In the 18th century, some Arins moved south and made a separate seok within the Tatyshev administrative clan.

By 1740, the original Arin language was extinct and the population had switched to Turkic.

In the 19th century, the last Arins had been Turkified or Russified; those in close contact with the Kachins may have been incorporated into the Khakas. The Arin are mentioned as the seok "aara" (Khakas: аара) as a component of the Kachin subgroup.

The Arins have left toponymic traces in their former territory; examples include the Buzim river (from Arin Бу-Зим 'muddy river') and the village of Areyskoye. Streets in north Krasnoyarsk take their name from the Arins, Arinskaya and Abytayevskaya. The island of Tatyshev is named after the Arin "princeling" known as Tatysh in Turkic. Tatysh's son Bugach has a river, a city microdistrict, the suburban village Bugachevo, and a railway station named after him.

== See also ==
- Kets
- Yugs
- Kotts
- Assans
- Pumpokols

== Bibliography ==
- Edward J. Vajda, Yeniseian Peoples and Languages: A History of Yeniseian Studies with an Annotated Bibliography and a Source Guide, Routledge, 2013, 391 p. ISBN 9781136837401
