= Pumpokol language =

Extinct Yeniseian language

Pumpokol
- Gebéŋ-aj, Gebèng-ai
- Native to: Russia
- Region: Yenisei
- Ethnicity: Pumpokols
- Extinct: 1740
- Language family: Yeniseian: Pumpokolic; Pumpokol

Language codes
- ISO 639-3: xpm
- Glottolog: pump1237
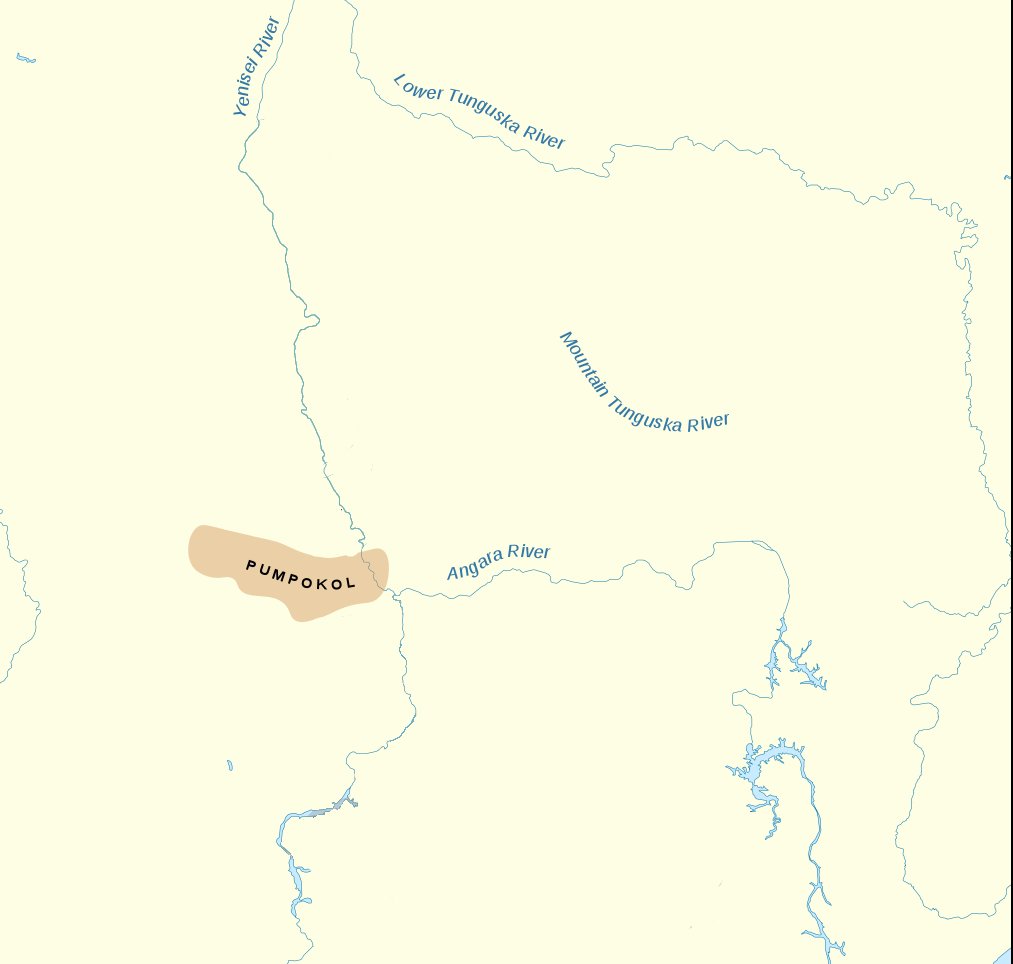
- The historical, pre-contact range of Pumpokol.

Pumpokol (Pumpokol: gebeŋ-aj) is an extinct Yeniseian language, formerly spoken by the Pumpokol people (Gebéŋ). It has been extinct since the first half of the 18th century. It is poorly attested, and some of the vocabulary has been identified as being Yugh, not Pumpokol.

Pumpokol seems to share some features with the ancient Xiongnu and Jie languages, and according to Alexander Vovin, Edward Vajda, and Étienne de la Vaissière, is closely related to them.

== Sources ==
Current knowledge of the Pumpokol language derives primarily from the records of German travelers D. G. Messerschmidt and G. F. Müller, published by Peter Simon Pallas in his Linguarum totius orbis vocabularia comparativa (1786). Additionally, Eugene Helimski published further 18th-century manuscript wordlists of Pumpokol and Kott in 1986.

== Classification ==
It has traditionally been viewed as being grouped with Arin in an Arin-Pumpokol subfamily of Southern Yeniseian, but Vajda (2024) challenges this, stating that "Arin, Pumpokol and Kott-Assan display no shared innovations to support them as an opposite "'Southern Yeniseian' branch" of Yeniseian, reflecting only their geographical position rather than a genealogical grouping. According to O. Tailleur, it should be considered a dialect of the Ket language, as most materials labeled 'Pumpokol' are in reality of Ketic affiliation, not Pumpokol. Furthermore, the term 'Pumpokol' was originally geographic, referring to the name of a town and a former district (volost), originating from Khanty: pum-poxəl "grassy village". Pumpokols and Yughs frequently mixed with each other in the Pumpokol volost. This may be the reason for the mislabeling of these words.

== Phonology ==
Pumpokol is notable among the Yeniseian languages in that the phoneme /s/ is often replaced by /t/. This idiosyncrasy of Pumpokol seems to be shared with the language of the Jie, suggesting that Jie is more closely related to Pumpokol than other Yeniseian languages. For example the Jie word kot 'catch' seems to be a cognate with the Ket word qos, having the same sound change.

Moreover, this aforementioned characteristic of Pumpokol has been used by Vajda to demonstrate that Yeniseian-derived hydronyms in northern Mongolia (the southernmost known extent of Yeniseian influence), -tat, -dat, -tet, -det, -tom, -dɨt are exclusively Pumpokolic. Since the Jie, as a tribe of the Xiongnu, are likely to have come from the same area, rather than further north, this finding lends credence to the possibility that Jie is a Pumpokolic language.

=== Vowels ===
The reconstructed vowels of Pumpokol are as follows, based on G. F. Müller's materials:

	Front	Central	Back
Close	i [i]	ɨ [ɨ]	u [u]
Close-mid	e [e]		o [o]
Open-mid	ɛ [ɛ]		ɔ [ɔ]
Open		a [a]	

=== Consonants ===
According to G. F. Müller's notes, the consonants of Pumpokol are as follows:

		Labial	Dental	Palatal	Velar	Uvular	Laryngeal/ Pharyngeal
Plosive	voiceless	p [p]	t [t]	(tʼ [tʲ])	k [k]	q [q]	(ʔ [ʔ])^{1}
Plosive	voiced	b [b]	d [d]	(dʼ [dʲ])	g [g] (gʼ [gʲ])		
Fricative	voiceless	f [f]	s [s]			x [χ], xʼ [χʲ]	-h- [h]?^{2}
Fricative	voiced	(v [v])	(z [z])	(ž [ʒ])			
Affricate		(pf [pf] pʰ [pʰ])	c [t͡s]	č [t͡ʃ] (dž [d͡ʒ])			
Nasal		m [m]	n [n]	(nʼ [nʲ])	ŋ [ŋ]		
Lateral			l [l]	(lʼ [lʲ])			
Approximant				j [j]			
Trill			r [r]				

1. [ʔ] only occurs as a prosodic device of tone, as in other Yeniseian languages.
2. Pumpokol word-initial [h] only sometimes corresponds to Arin [k], and is not present in other Yeniseian languages.

The phonemes ⟨č⟩, ⟨dʼ⟩, and ⟨dž⟩ are allophones of ⟨č⟩, ⟨k⟩ and ⟨g⟩ are allophones of ⟨k⟩, and ⟨x⟩, ⟨q⟩ and ⟨xʼ⟩ are allophones of ⟨χ⟩. Thus, the phonemes in brackets are not really phonologically relevant.

Sibilant phonemes are absent in words of native Yeniseian origin.

== Vocabulary ==
Selected Pumpokol words are presented here, sourced from Werner 2005.

Word	Meaning	Comment
ab	father	
am	mother	
ak	to lie down	
hóxon	forest, tree	
eg	egg	cf. Ket ɛˀj
fala	son	
falla	boy, son	
hixem	Sun	
xaj	mountain	
kut	horse	
meža	measure	Russian loan
píkola	daughter, girl	
hukút	house, village	Literally "together-tent"

Pumpokol words in Pallas 1789
Russian gloss	бог	небо	вечер	лес	дерево	земля	поле	снег	вода	дух	вино	свинья	труд	здоров	они
English translation	God	sky, heaven	evening	forest	tree	earth	field	snow	water	spirit	wine	pig	work	healthy	they
Pumpokol translation	еч	еч	бичиди, бись	акь	оксы	бинг	ембагь	тыгь, бечь	уль	бей	бино	фохириць	ирдлег	етыкеть	буегь

=== Numerals ===
Pumpokol numerals
No.	Numerals (Werner 2005)	Numerals (Pallas 1789)
1	xúta	ху́та
2	hínɛaŋ ~ hínɛa	нинеангь
3	dóŋa	донга
4	ciaŋ	ци́ангь
5	héjlaŋ	хе́нлангь
6	aɡɡiaŋ ~ áɡiang	аггьянгь
7	ónʼaŋ	оньянгь
8	hinbasiaŋ	г̧инбассїангь
9	xúta-xamóssa-xaíaŋ	ху́та-ямосса-хайянгь
10	xaiáŋ (xajáŋ)	хайянгь
11	xúta-iga-xaiáŋ	
12	hínɛa-xaiáŋ	
20	hédiaŋ	
30	doŋbaksɨn	
40	situdi	
50	xeiltudi	
60	altudi	
70	óntudi	
80	hinbassitudi	
90	xatósaxa	
100	útamsa	утанса
200	hin-útamsa	
300	doŋ-útamsa	
400	ci-útamsa	
500	xeil-útamsa	
600	ag-útamsa	
700	on-útamsa	
800	hintassi-útamsa	
900	xatóssa-xága-útamsa	
1000	xa-útamsa	ха-утанса
