= Pumpokol people =

Pumpokols
Gebéŋ

Total population
- 34-35 (17th century)

Regions with significant populations
- Siberia (Russia)

Languages
- formerly Pumpokol

Related ethnic groups
- other Yeniseian people

The Pumpokols (Pumpokol: Gebéŋ) were a Yeniseian people, part of the people sometimes referred to as Ostyaks. By mixing and Russification, they were assimilated by the end of the 20th century.

The Pumpokol ethnonym Gebéŋ, related to Yugh Chaibaŋ, originally meant somerthing like 'mountainous area' or 'area with a steep riverbank', and as an ethnonym meant 'people of the mountain area'.

== See also ==
- Kets
- Yugs
- Kotts
- Assans

== Bibliography ==
- Edward J. Vajda, Yeniseian Peoples and Languages: A History of Yeniseian Studies with an Annotated Bibliography and a Source Guide, Routledge, 2013, 391 p. ISBN 9781136837401
