= Jie people =

Historical ethnic group in Chinese history

Jie
羯 *ki̯at
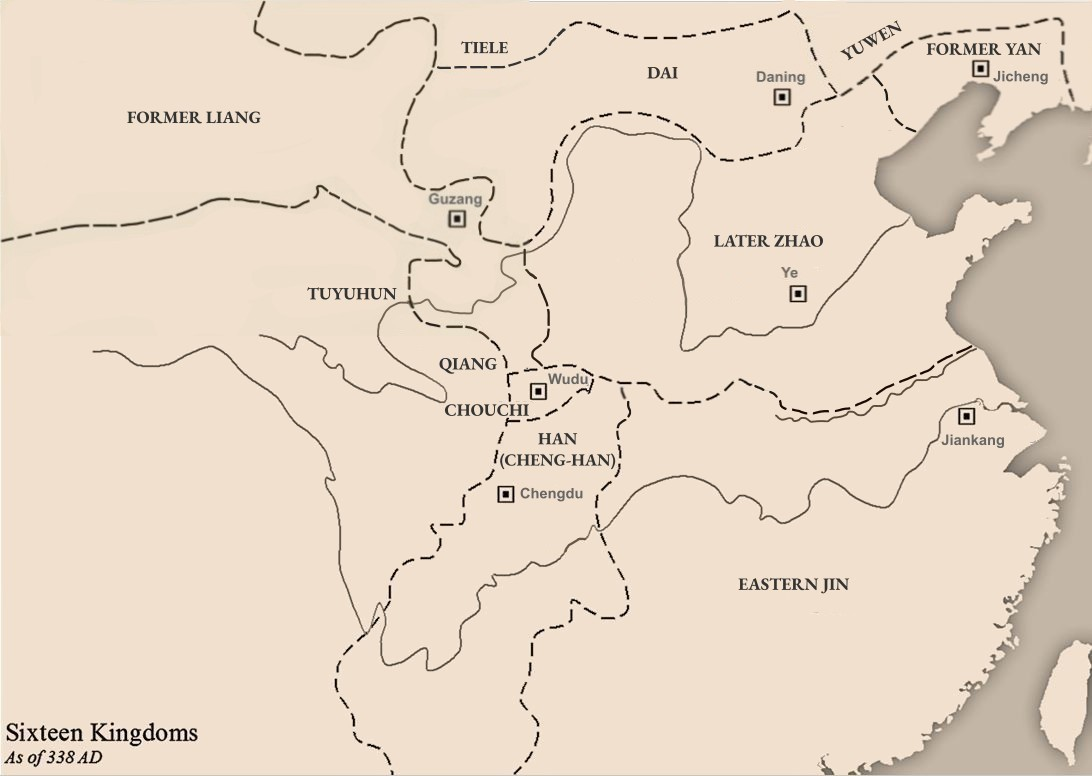
- Map of Sixteen Kingdoms in 338 AD, showing the Later Zhao, a state ruled by the Jie.

Total population
- assimilated into Han

Regions with significant populations
- Later Zhao

Languages
- Jie

The Jie (Chinese: 羯; pinyin: Jié; Wade–Giles: Chieh^{²}; Middle Chinese: [ki̯at]), also known as the Jiehu (羯胡), were an ethnic group of northern China. Regarded as one of the "Five Barbarians" of the Sixteen Kingdoms period, the Jie rose and fell in northern China within the first half of the 4th century AD under Shi Le and the Later Zhao dynasty.

There is much debate surrounding the origins of the Jie. It is generally accepted that they came to modern-day Shanxi as an offshoot of the Southern Xiongnu, but their names and physical appearances have led researchers to believe that they were at least part Indo-European, possibly Sogdian or Yuezhi. (Note: Medieval Sinologist David A. Graff suggests Central Asian or Iranian origins.) The Jie also left behind a single phrase from their language, which had been analyzed as either belonging to the Turkic or Yeniseian language families. Proponents of the Yeniseian theory specifically connect the Jie to the Ket people.

Many of the Jie were massacred by Ran Min and his followers in 349–350 AD, after which their population seemingly disappeared overnight. Nonetheless, their name continued to appear in later records and literatures, with historians attempting to link a few prominent figures such as Hou Jing and An Lushan to the Jie.

== Name and origins ==
Historical Chinese records vaguely refer to the Jie as being a "separate branch" of the Xiongnu. It is generally interpreted that the Jie came from tribes or groups who were annexed by the Xiongnu Empire during the height of their expansion. When the empire split into two in the 1st century AD, the southern chanyu brought his followers to surrender to the Han dynasty, who relocated them along northern frontier in Bing province. The dissolution of the chanyu in the 3rd century later led to the decline of the Xiongnu identity, as their descendants within the Great Wall were broadly called "Hu" or grouped into larger "mixed Hu" groups (雜胡; záhú) such as the Jie.

The name "Jie" is the Chinese word for "wether" or "castrated sheep", which was often used as a pejorative by the Chinese. According to the Book of Wei (6th century AD), the name was specifically derived from the Jiéshì area (羯室, modern Yushe County in Shanxi province), where the Jie resided. The Jie appeared to have been of low status, mainly working as slaves or tenant farmers for Chinese magnates. Records also describe them as having high noses, full beards and deep eyes, which led researchers to believe that they were of mixed Central Asian or Indo-European origins.

The Book of Jin provides that Shi Le's ancestors were members of the Qiāngqú (羌渠), one of the nineteen tribes of the Southern Xiongnu. Also among the nineteen tribes was a tribe known as the Lijie (力羯). Sinologist Edwin G. Pulleyblank suggests that Qiangqu was a transliteration of Kangju, a kingdom in Central Asia, whose name is likely a variant form of Sogdia and were once subordinate to the Xiongnu. The Qiangqu tribe may have been formed by the Xiongnu out of citizens captured and extracted from Kangju. Some have further link Shi Le's surname, Shi (石), and Jie (羯) to a Sogdian statelet known as 石國 Shíguó (literally, "Stone Country", at Chach Zhěshí 赭時, now Tashkent, also meaning "Stone City" in Common Turkic).

Aside from the Sogdian theory, historians such as Yao Weiyuan instead link the Jie to the Lesser Yuezhi (Xiao Yuezhi 小月氏), another Indo-European people who lived closer to the Han dynasty's western periphery and were also once vassalized by the Xiongnu. A few others that studied the Jie language suggests that they were related to the Ket people of Siberia. According to Chen Yong, many of the later "Jie" under Shi Le and the Later Zhao were likely from other Hu groups or even Han Chinese, asserting that Shi Le, due to the small size of his own tribe, promoted a common "Jie" or "Guoren" (國人; "Compatriots") identity to stregthen his own power base, which would explain the sudden spike and decline of the Jie population around this time.

== Jie language ==
There are widely differing accounts of the exact language of the Jie, with two theories uncertainly suggesting that the Jie language was either Turkic or Yeniseian.

Others claim that the Jie were an ancient Yeniseian-speaking tribe related to the Ket people, who today live between the Ob and Yenisey rivers—the character 羯 (jié) is pronounced /kiɛt̚/ in Hokkien, /kʰiːt̚/ or /kiːt̚/ in Cantonese, /ciat̚/ in Hakka and ketsu in Japanese, implying that the ancient pronunciation might have been fairly close to Ket (kʰeˀt). (Note: Western Washington University historical linguist Edward Vajda spent a year in Siberia studying the Ket people and their language and his findings helped substantiate such conjecture into the origins of the Ket people, where DNA claims show genetic affinities with people of China and Myanmar, suggesting a Sino-Tibetan origin. He further proposes a relationship of the Ket language to the Na-Dene languages indigenous to Canada and western United States, and even suggests the tonal system of the Ket language is closer to that of Vietnamese than any of the native Siberian languages.) The root 羯 may be transliterated as Jié- or Tsze^{2}- and an older form, < kiat, may also be reconstructed. This ethnonym might be cognate with the ethnonyms of Yeniseian-speaking peoples, such as the Ket and the Kott (who spoke the extinct Kott language, but their ethnonym is believed to have Buryat origins). Pulleyblank (1962) connected the ethnonym to Proto-Yeniseian *qeˀt/s (*cew-ç) "stone". Vovin et al. (2016) also pointed to *keˀt (*qid) "person, human being" as another possible source. Alexander Vovin also suggests that the Xiongnu spoke a Yeniseian language, further connecting them with the Jie people.

Among the Yeniseian languages, Jie is hypothesized to be Pumpokolic. Vovin, Vajda, and de la Vaissière have suggested that Jie shares the same idiosyncrasies with the Pumpokol language, and the two are therefore closely related. This argument is strengthened by the fact that in northern Mongolia, Yeniseian-derived hydronyms have been demonstrated to be exclusively Pumpokolic, while influence from other Yeniseian languages is only found further north. This therefore lends credence to the theory that the Jie are a Pumpokolic-speaking tribe, and confirms that the Pumpokolic-speaking Yeniseians existed in the core territory of the Xiongnu state.

== History ==
=== Sixteen Kingdoms ===
Most of what is known about the Jie people comes from the Later Zhao dynasty, one of the Sixteen Kingdoms that existed in the first half of the 4th-century. The earliest recorded Jie was Shi Le, a minor chieftain from Wuxiang County in Bing province (roughly modern-day Shanxi) under the Western Jin dynasty. However, his name was not originally "Shi Le", as it does not appear that the Jie had family names; Instead, his original name was either Bei (㔨) or Fule (匐勒). He became chieftain by succeeding his father Zhouhezhu (周曷朱) and grandfather Yeyiyu (耶奕于) before him. When a famine struck Bing in 303 AD, he and many other Jie and Hu people became displaced. The Jin provincial inspector, looking to fund his military for an ongoing civil war, had these people captured and sold into slavery. As a result, the Jie and Hu were scattered around the Hebei and Shandong regions, with Shi Le himself also becoming a slave.

After attaining his freedom, Shi Le became a bandit and later a rebel leader with his Han Chinese friend, Ji Sang, who reportedly gave Shi Le his Chinese name. When their rebellion was defeated in 307 AD, Shi Le joined the Han-Zhao dynasty, where he quickly rose through the ranks and became an important commander in their war against the Jin. The Han court was powerless to subdue Shi Le, who effectively became an independent warlord over the Hebei at his capital of Xiangguo. In 319 AD, he formally broke away and established the Later Zhao, going on to conquer his former state in 329 AD. While far reaches of the north remained out of their rule, the Later Zhao would dominate northern China and maintain a stalemate with the Eastern Jin dynasty in the south for the next two decades.

To strengthen his power base, Shi Le issued a ban on the word "Hu", replacing it with the word "Guoren" (國人; "Compatriots") when addressing the Jie and other Hu tribes. Shi Le also adopted many people into his clan, a practice that seemingly originated from their tribal years. His father had previously adopted his distant cousin, Shi Hu, who was the son of Koumi (寇覓) and the grandson of Beixie (㔨邪). During his rise to power, Shi Le adopted the likes of Shi Hui (石会), previously Zhang Beidu (張㔨督) of a separate Hu tribe, as an elder brother, and Shi Pu (石璞), great-grandson of the prominent Chinese minister, Shi Bao, as a kinsman. Shi Hu and the rest of these adopted family members were given key positions as generals and officials.

After Shi Le's death in 333 AD, Shi Hu violently seized power from his son, Shi Hong and usurped the throne the following year. During his 15-year reign of terror, Shi Hu shifted the capital to Ye and frequently oppressed the common Chinese people through corvée and conscriptions. At the same time, he also promoted the spread of Buddhism through the Kuchean monk, Fotu Cheng. Shi Hu also attempted to expand his empire's borders, but had minimal success. After he died in 349 AD, his family members engaged in a brutal internecine struggle for the throne, and during the course of the conflict, his adopted Chinese grandson, Shi Min forcibly took control of the emperor and capital. The Later Zhao was split into two as Shi Zhi, a son of Shi Hu, mounted his opposition to Shi Min from the old capital at Xiangguo.

Following several failed attempts on his life, Shi Min suspected that he could no longer trust the Jie and Hu people living within Ye. By the end of the year, he ordered the killing of every Jie and Hu, identifying them by their high noses and full beards. Shi Min personally led his soldiers to massacre the tribes in Ye while his generals purged their armies of the tribesmen. According to some sources, more than 200,000 of them were slain, but a large portion of them were also Han Chinese who were mistaken by their facial features. In 350 AD, Shi Min slaughtered the Shi clan in Ye, changed his name to Ran Min and proclaimed himself Emperor of (Ran) Wei.

Ran Min's genocide policy appears to have ceased shortly after, as he granted his son the title of chanyu to win back the support of the tribes. Regardless, his killing order had already had an adverse effect the Jie population. The civil war ended with the massacre of Shi Zhi and his family at Xiangguo in 351 AD, bringing an end to the Later Zhao. The last members of the Shi clan fled to the Eastern Jin in the south, where they were all sentenced to death upon their arrival. The remaining Jie people were eventually annexed by the Xianbei-led Former Yan, who defeated Ran Min and conquered northeastern China.

=== Later history ===
After the demise of the Later Zhao, the Jie name would sporadically appear in the coming centuries, though it is unclear if the people in reference were actually related to the ethnic Jie. Modern historian Huang Yongnian argued that the word "Jie" had become a pejorative for northern minority groups in general, citing numerous instances in historical texts where the term had been used against people of explicitly different ethnicities. In 445–446 AD, a rebellion broke out in northwestern China led by Gai Wu against the Northern Wei dynasty. The Book of Qi, compiled by the Liang dynasty of southern China in the 6th century, describe Gai Wu as a Jiehu (羯胡), but the Wei's own records, the Book of Wei, identifies him as a Lushuihu.

Later on, the Northern Wei government was taken over by the powerful commander, Erzhu Rong and his family from 528 to 533 AD. The Erzhu were known as Qihu people (契胡) who had previously been granted a hereditary domain in Xiurong (秀容, in present-day Shuozhou, Shanxi) by the Wei in 398 AD. However, apart from their family, there is seemingly no other recorded activities about the Qihu. Historians such as Chen Yinke and Zhou Yiliang believe that "Qi" (契) was a transliteration of "Jie" (羯), and that the Erzhu were actually of Jie ethnicity.

A contemporary of Erzhu Rong was Hou Jing, who was a notorious rebel warlord under the Eastern Wei and Liang dynasties, as well as briefly the Emperor of Han before his death in 552 AD. His biographies in the Book of Liang and History of the Southern Dynasties do not specifically mention his ethnic background, but there are excerpts from his enemies that insultingly call him a "fierce Jie" (兇羯) or "Jie bandit" (羯贼), which led many historians to conclude that he was a Jie. At the same time, Hou Jing and his family were also from Huaishuo (懷朔; northeast of Guyang County, Inner Mongolia), one of the Six Northern Garrisons of the Northern Wei, which were profoundly influenced by Xianbei military culture. Therefore, Hou Jing is often described as a Xianbei-ized Jie.

The Tang dynasty rebel, An Lushan (703–757 AD) was also denigrated as a "Jie" in Tang records and literature. Historians have suggested that this appellation was further evidence for the Jie people's connection to Sogdia, as An Lushan is believed to be the son of a Sogdian father, albeit with a Göktürk mother. During the Five Dynasties and Ten Kingdoms period, the unearthed epitaph of Shi Chonggui, the last ruler of the Later Jin (936–947 AD), claimed that he was a descendant of Shi Le. The Shi clan of Later Jin were Shatuo Turks, though may have been of Sogdian descent.

== Religion ==
Both Shi Le and Shi Hu endorsed Buddhism by granting the Kuchean monk, Fotu Cheng a privileged position within their government. Buddhism was at first restricted to government officials, but as the religion became increasingly popular among commoners as well, Shi Hu encouraged religious freedom, stating that his people have the right to worship the Buddha, who was a "foreigner" like him. Under Later Zhao, Fotu Cheng's teachings spread, and more than 800 Buddhist monastries were established. The Jie were also noted to have practiced cremation, which was notably a custom in the city-state of Chach in the Western Regions.

Aside from that, some scholars have speculated that the Jie believed in Sogdian Zoroastrianism, stating that there was a temple or altar in Ye called "Hutian" (胡天), which was the Chinese name for the Zoroastrian god, Ahura Mazda. Another example they cite was the construction of a giant lamp during Shi Hu's crowning ceremony as Heavenly King due to the veneration of fire in the religion.

== See also ==
- Ethnic groups in Chinese history
- Zhongshan (state)
