= Jie language =

Unclassified extinct language formerly spoken in northeast China

Jie
- Chieh
- *Kɨr/*Kjet
- Native to: Later Zhao dynasty
- Region: Northern China
- Ethnicity: Jie people
- Era: 4th century
- Language family: Turkic or Yeniseian
- Writing system: transcribed with Chinese characters

Language codes
- ISO 639-3: None (mis)
- Glottolog: None
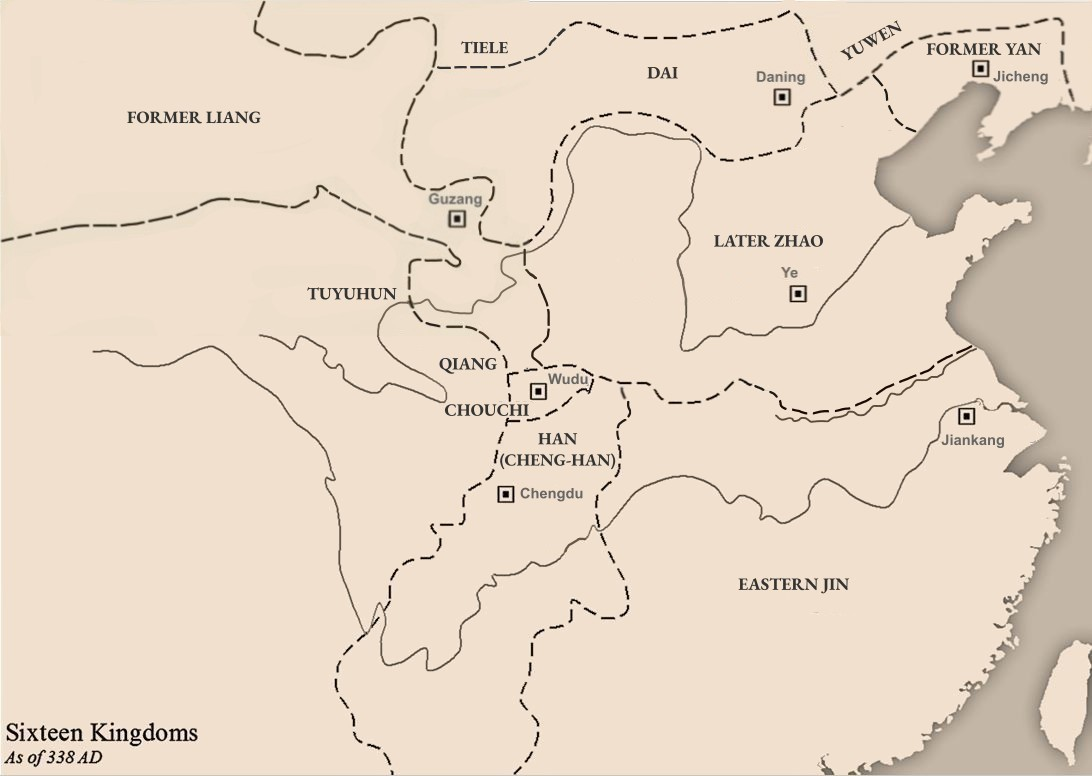
- Map of Sixteen Kingdoms in year 338, showing the Later Zhao, a state ruled by the Jie.

Jie (simplified Chinese: 羯语; traditional Chinese: 羯語; pinyin: Jiéyǔ) is a poorly attested extinct language formerly spoken in northeast China during the Later Zhao dynasty by the Jie people, who were formerly part of the Xiongnu confederation. It has been considered to be of either Turkic or Yeniseian affiliation.

== Attestation ==
Only one phrase in the native language of the Jie is known. The source for this phrase was the Kuchean Buddhist monk and missionary Fotudeng. It was recorded in the Book of Jin as 秀支替戾岡，僕穀劬禿當 and said to have a connection to Shi Le's fight against Liu Yao in 328. The phrase was glossed with a Chinese translation:

Text	Middle Chinese (Note: Middle Chinese pronunciation follows Pulleyblank.)	Gloss
秀支	[si̯u-ci̯e]	軍 "army"
替戾岡	[tʰei-let/lei-kɑŋ]	出 "go out"
僕穀	[bok/buk-kuk/yok]	劉曜胡位 Liu Yao's barbarian title
劬禿當	[ɡi̯u̯o-tʰuk-tɑŋ]	捉 "capture"

=== Analysis ===
==== Turkic ====
This phrase has been analyzed in a number of publications. Shiratori (1900), Ramstedt (1922), Bazin (1948), von Gabain (1950), Shervashidze (1986), and Shimunek (2015) recognized Turkic lexicon, and gave their versions of the transcription and translation:

Ramstedt	Bazin	von Gabain	Shervashidze	Shimunek
Sükä talıqın bügüg tutun!	Süg tägti ıdqaŋ boquγıγ tutqaŋ!	Särig tılıtqan buγuγ kötürkän	Sükâ tol'iqtin buγuγ qodigo(d)tin	su-Ø kete-r erkan boklug-gu tukta-ŋ
Go with a war [and] capture bügü!	Send the army to attack, capture the commander!	You'd put forth the army, you'd take the deer	You came to the army Deposed buγuγ	When/as the army goes out, capture the Boklug!

==== Yeniseian ====
Edwin G. Pulleyblank (1963) argued that the Turkic interpretations cannot be considered very successful because they conflict with the phonetic values of the Chinese text and with the Chinese translation. Instead, he suggested a connection with the Yeniseian languages, as well as remarking on the Yeniseian verb ending -ŋ, particularly common in Kott. In contrast, second-person plural imperatives in Old Turkic also end in -ŋ (e.g. in military commands).

Alexander Vovin (2000) gave the following translation based on Yeniseian, corroborating Pulleyblank's findings. Vovin (2000) suggests a connection with the Southern Yeniseian branch.

suke t-i-r-ek-ang bok-kok k-o-t-o-kt-ang
armies {PV-CM-PERF-go out-3P} bok-kok PV-?-OBJ-CM-catch-3P
Armies have gone out. [They] will catch Bokkok.

The verbal ending -ŋ can be seen in Jie, which is a common verb ending in Yeniseian languages, particularly Kott. The cognate form of the Jie words kot-o-kt-aŋ 'they will catch' in Ket is d-kas-a-qos-n, showing the characteristic of Pumpokol where the sound /t/ corresponds the Ket sound /s/; thus Jie is thought to be closely related to Pumpokol. The Arin word kel 'fight' partly coincides in the second syllable of *śuke 'army', however the connection is dubious and Vovin suggested it to be a loanword, because if Pumpokolic speakers became part of Xiongnu, the word for army would have likely been loaned.

Vovin et al. (2016) revise the above translation, as well as mapping the verbs over a Ket verb template and criticizing Shimunek et al.'s interpretation of the couplet.

śuke t-il-ek-ang bok-kok got-o-kt-aŋ
army/armies? {out-PAST-go-3ANIM.PL.SBJ} ? {foot(?)-3MASC.SG.OBJ-take-3ANIM.PL.SBJ}
Armies went out and will catch Bokkok!

Savelyev and Jeong (2020) criticize Vovin's Yeniseian reading of the couplet, noting that out of the four words of the couplet, only two may tentatively be read based on Pumpokol data, with both words including lexical and grammatical morphemes that are not actually attested in Pumpokol. The other two do not have any hypothetical parallel in Yeniseian; thus, Vovin et al. (2016) had to assume a loan from an unidentified source into the supposedly Pumpokolic language of the Xiongnu, thus making the reading quite doubtful.
