= Arin language =

Extinct Yeniseian language of Russia

Arin
- Ar, Ara
- Native to: Russia
- Region: Yenisei River
- Ethnicity: Arin people
- Extinct: late 1730s, with the death of Arzamas Loskutov
- Language family: Yeniseian: Arinic; Arin

Language codes
- ISO 639-3: xrn
- Glottolog: arin1243
- Map of pre-contact Yeniseian languages. Arin is in blue.

Arin is an extinct Yeniseian language formerly spoken in Russia by the Arin people along the Yenisei River, predominantly on its western shore, between Yeniseysk and Krasnoyarsk, north of the Minusinsk region. However, it has been suggested that the Arin people had historically occupied a larger geographical range. It became extinct in the 18th century, with the death of Arzamas Loskutov, who was an informant for Gerhard Friedrich Müller in 1731, and for a Cossack adventurer named Ivan Kovrigin on November 27, 1735.

It is believed that the term Ar or Ara was used by speakers of Arin to refer to themselves.

== Classification ==
It is classified as belonging to the Arinic branch, being its only attested language. The closest known relative of Arin, Pumpokol, has been suggested to be similar to the language of the ruling elite of the Xiongnu, as well as that of the Jie ruling class of the Later Zhao dynasty.

== Geographical distribution ==
Hydronyms associated with Arin have the suffixes -set, -igai, -lat, -zat, -zet and -sat (meaning "river") and -kul'/-kul (meaning "water"). These hydronyms, along with Khanty folklore telling of an eastern people known as the ar-jäx "Ar people", indicate that Arin may have once been spread out as far west as the Ob.

== Phonology ==
One notable aspect of the Arin phonology is the correspondence of words starting with the word-initial k- and words in other Yeniseian languages that start with a bare vowel. For example, the Arin word kul (meaning 'water') corresponds to the Ket word uˑl’ and the Kott word ûl. This feature of Arin allows for far more accurate reconstructing of the Proto-Yeniseian language by historical linguistics, for instance, the Proto-Yeniseian term for "water" is reconstructed as *xuɬ, where the initial *x- could not be inferred if not for Arin attestation.

=== Vowels ===
The vowel system in Arin is as follows:

| | Front | Central | Back |
|---|---|---|---|
| Close | i | ɨ | u |
| Close-mid | e | | o |
| Open-mid | ɛ | (ʌ)^{1} | ɔ |
| Open | æ | a | |

1. The sound [ʌ], transcribed as ö, is only attested in the words ögga 'six', qoa-ögga 'sixteen', ögťuːŋ 'sixty', and utqʼöːnoŋ 'ear', and potentially also in pon’a (also recorded as pun) 'duck'.

=== Consonants ===
| | | Labial | | Dental | Palatal | Velar | | Uvular | | Laryngeal/ Pharyngeal |
| | | plain | pal. | Dental | Palatal | plain | pal. | plain | pal. | Laryngeal/ Pharyngeal |
|---|---|---|---|---|---|---|---|---|---|---|
| Plosive | voiceless | p [p] | pʼh [pʲ] | t [t] | tʼ [tʲ] | k [k] | kʼ [kʲ] | q [q] | qʼ [qʲ] | (ʔ [ʔ])^{1} |
| Plosive | voiced | b [b] | | d [d] | dʼ [dʲ] | g [g] | | | | |
| Fricative | voiceless | (f [f]) | | s [s] š [ʃ] | sʼ [sʲ] | | | x [χ] | | (h [h]) |
| Fricative | voiced | (v [v]) | | z [z] ž [ʒ] | | | | | | |
| Affricate | | | | c [t͡s] | č [t͡ʃ] (dž [d͡ʒ]) | | | | | |
| Nasal | | m [m] | mʼ [mʲ] | n [n] | nʼ [nʲ] | ŋ [ŋ] | | | | |
| Lateral | | | | l [l] | lʼ [lʲ] | | | | | |
| Approximant | | | | | j [j] | | | | | |
| Trill | | | | r [r] | (rʼ [rʲ]) | | | | | |

Consonants in parentheses are sparsely attested or unattested.

1. [ʔ] is only assumed from other Yeniseian languages and is only a prosodic device of tone.

There are 11 palatal-nonpalatal consonant oppositions.

== Lexicon ==
Etymological analysis suggests that speakers of the Arin language, as with other members of the Yeniseian people, were bilingual in Siberian Turkic languages; for example, the Arin word teminkur (meaning "ore") has been suggested to stem from the Old Turkic compound word *tämir qān (meaning "iron blood"). There are over 400 lexica for the Arin language, recorded in the 18th century.

=== General ===
Arin words in Pallas 1789
| Russian gloss | бог | небо | вечер | лес | глина | поле | снег | ветер | вино |
| English translation | God | sky, heaven | evening | forest | clay | field | snow | spirit | wine |
| Arin translation | еc | эc | пись | още | тьюбурунг | кья́ба | тье | паи | арага́ |

=== Body parts ===
Arin body parts in Pallas 1789
| Russian gloss | волос | голова | ухо | глаз | нос | рот | язык | щёки | борода | плечо | рука | пальцы | нога | живот | спина | плоть | сердце |
| English translation | hair | head | ear | eye | nose | mouth | tongue | cheek | beard | shoulder | hand | fingers | leg | stomach | back | flesh | heart |
| Arin translation | кья́ганг | колкья | уткьэно́нг | тенг | аркӷуй | бюкьо́н | алъяп | быкӷолю́нг | королеп | хинанг | пъӷяга | кӷо́лпас | пил | пъӷорга | кӷоп | ис | шеноугбу |

=== Family members ===
Arin family member words in Pallas 1789
| Russian gloss | отец | мать | сын | дочь | брат | сестра | муж | жена | девочка | мальчик | дитя | человек |
| English translation | father | mother | son | daughter | brother | sister | husband | wife | girl | boy | child | human, person |
| Arin translation | ипя, бъяп | бя́мя | бикял | бик-ялья | бамага́л | бамагалья | бикъярьят | бикӷама́л | бикъялья | бикъял | алполат | кьит |

=== Numerals ===
Numerals in Arin
| No. | Numerals (Werner 2005) | Numerals (Pallas 1789) |
|---|---|---|
| 1 | qusej | Кг̧узей |
| 2 | kina | Ки́на |
| 3 | tʼoŋa | Тьюнга |
| 4 | šája ~ šaga ~ šeja | Ша́га |
| 5 | qala ~ qaga ~ kala | Ка́ла |
| 6 | ögga ~ ɨga ~ ɛge | Эгга |
| 7 | ɨnʼa ~ ona ~ una | Ыньа |
| 8 | kinamančau | Кинаманчау́ |
| 9 | qusamančau | Кг̧усаманчау |
| 10 | qoa | Кг̧оа |
| 11 | qóa-qúsa | |
| 12 | qóa-kina | |
| 13 | qóa-tʼoŋa | |
| 14 | qoa-šaja | |
| 15 | qoa-qala | |
| 16 | qoa-ögga | |
| 17 | qoa-ɨnʼa | |
| 18 | qoa-kinamančaú | |
| 19 | qoa-qusamančau | |
| 20 | kintʼuŋ | |
| 30 | tʼoŋtʼuːŋ | |
| 40 | šájtʼuːŋ | |
| 50 | qaltʼuːŋ | |
| 60 | ögtʼuːŋ ~ uj-tuŋ | |
| 70 | ɨ́ntʼuŋ | |
| 80 | kina-mančaú tʼuːŋ | |
| 90 | qusamančautʼuːŋ | |
| 100 | jus | Іусь |
| 200 | kin-jus | |
| 300 | tʼoŋ-jus | |
| 1000 | qo-jus | |
