= Proto-Yeniseian language =

Reconstructed ancestor of the Yeniseian languages

Proto-Yeniseian
- Proto-Yeniseic, PY
- Reconstruction of: Yeniseian languages
- Lower-order reconstructions: Proto-Ketic; Proto-Pumpokolic; Proto-Arinic; Proto-Kottic

Proto-Yeniseian or Proto-Yeniseic is the unattested reconstructed proto-language from which all Yeniseian languages are thought to descend. It is uncertain whether Proto-Yeniseian had a similar tone/pitch accent system as Ket. Many studies about Proto-Yeniseian phonology have been done; however, there are still many things unclear about Proto-Yeniseian. The probable location of the Yeniseian homeland is proposed on the basis of geographic names and genetic studies, which suggests a homeland in Southern Siberia.

== Phonology ==
According to Vajda, Proto-Yeniseian had the following phonemes, expressed in IPA symbols.

=== Consonants ===
		Bilabial	Alveolar	Postalveolar	Retroflex	Palatal	Labiovelar	Velar	Uvular
Nasal		*m	*n				*ŋʷ	*ŋ	
Plosive	voiceless	*p	*t	*č [t͡ʃ]	*tʳ [ʈ]	*c	*kʷ	*k	*q
Plosive	voiced	*b	*d	*ǰ [d͡ʒ]	*dʳ [ɖ]	*ɟ	*ɡʷ	*ɡ	*ɢ
Fricative			*s	*š [ʃ]	(*šʳ [ʂ])	*ç	*xʷ	*x	*χ
Lateral			*ɬ	*tɬ					
Approximant		*w				*j			
Rhotic					*r				

=== Vowels ===
	Front	Central	Back
Close	*i *ij *iw		*u *uj *uw
Mid	*e *ej *ew		*o *oj *ow
Open		*a *aj *aw	
