= Edward Vajda =

American linguist (born 1958)

Edward J. Vajda
- Born: Edward M. Johnson; September 10, 1958 (age 68); Camp Lejeune, North Carolina
- Occupation: Linguist

Academic work
- Institutions: Western Washington University
- Main interests: Dené–Yeniseian languages, languages of northern Eurasia

Edward J. Vajda (Camp Lejeune, North Carolina, September 10, 1958 as Edward M. Johnson; changed his name in 1981) is a historical linguist at Western Washington University, Washington.

He is known for his work on the proposed Dené–Yeniseian language family, seeking to establish that the Ket language of Siberia and therefore its broader Yeniseian family have a common linguistic ancestor with the Na-Dené languages of North America. He began to study the Ket language in the 1990s, after the dissolution of the Soviet Union; he interviewed Ket speakers in Germany and later traveled to Tomsk in southwestern Siberia to perform fieldwork. In August 2008 he became the first North American to visit the Ket homeland in north-central Siberia's Turukhansky District, where he conducted intensive fieldwork with some of the remaining Ket speakers. Vajda's 67-page article "A Siberian link with Na-Dene languages" was published in 2010 in the Anthropological Papers of the University of Alaska. His theory has earned widespread, but not universal, support among professional linguists.

== Publications ==
Monographs

- Ket (Languages of the World/Materials Volume 204.) Munich: Lincom Europa, 2004.
- Mid-Holocene Language Connections between Asia and North America. Leiden: Brill, 2022 (authors: Michael Fortescue and Edward Vajda)
- Yeniseian Peoples and Languages: a history of their study with an annotated bibliography and a source guide. Surrey, England: Curzon Press, 2001. (389 pages)
- Ket Prosodic Phonology. (Languages of the World 15.) Munich: Lincom Europa, 2000
- Morfologicheskij slovar’ ketskogo glagola na osnove juzhnoketskogo dialekta [Morphological dictionary of the Ket verb, southern dialect] (co-authored with Marina Zinn), Tomsk: TGPU, 2004. (257 pages)
- Russian Punctuation and Related Symbols (co-authored with V. I. Umanets), Bloomington, Indiana: Slavica Publishers, 2005. (249 pages)

Edited volumes

- "Subordination and coordination strategies in North Asian languages." Current issues in linguistic theory, 300.) Amsterdam & Philadelphia: John Benjamins, 2008. (225 pp.)
- Languages and Prehistory of Central Siberia. (Current issues in linguistic theory, 262.) Amsterdam & Philadelphia: John Benjamins, 2004. (275 pp.)
- Studia Yeniseica: in honor of Heinrich Werner. Language typology and universals 56.1/2 (2003). Berlin: Akademie Verlag. (Co-edited with Gregory Anderson.)
