= Kott language =

Extinct Yeniseian language of Siberia

Kott
- Kot, Kottish, Kott–Assan
- kottuen
- Native to: Russia
- Region: originally Kan and Biryusa rivers, Agul in 19th century
- Ethnicity: Kott, Asan
- Extinct: 1850s
- Language family: Yeniseian: Kottic; Kott
- Early form: Old Kott
- Dialects: Kott A; Kott B; Kyshtym; Assan (status unclear); Yastin; Yarin; Baikot

Language codes
- ISO 639-3: zko
- Glottolog: kott1240
- Map of pre-contact Yeniseian languages.

- Kott is classified as Extinct by the UNESCO Atlas of the World's Languages in Danger (2001)

The Kott (Kot) language (Russian: Коттский язык) is an extinct Yeniseian language that was formerly spoken in central Siberia by the banks of the Mana River, a tributary of the Yenisei river. It became extinct in the 1850s. Kott was closely related to Ket, still spoken farther north along the Yenisei river. Assan, a close relative, is sometimes considered a dialect of Kott. The term kott may be derived from Buryat qota 'town', applied to neighbouring non-pastoral peoples, including the last few Kotts.

== Geographical distribution ==
Kott was spoken to the southeast of Krasnoyarsk, in the Biryusa and Kan river basins. However, hydronyms indicate a much wider area in the past, ranging from the Uda and Chuna rivers in the east to the Tom in the west.

== Documentation ==
One of the earliest written records of Kott is in 1791, with the publication of Peter Simon Pallas's Сравнительный словарь всѣхъ языковъ и нарѣчій, по азбучному порядку расположенный, a comparative dictionary of various world languages and dialects. In 1858, Matthias Castrén published the grammar and dictionary (Versuch einer jenissei-ostjakischen und kottischen Sprachlehre), which included material on the Kott and Ket (Yenisei-Ostyak) languages, recording two different dialects of Kott in the 1840s. There also exists two books written by Heinrich Werner about the Kott language, namely Коттский язык (Kottskij jazyk), which includes a 110-page Russian-Kott glossary, and Abriß der kottischen Grammatik.

== Phonology ==
=== Vowels ===
In multisyllabic words, vowel length is phonemic.

Vowels in Kott
	Front	Central	Back
Close	i [i]	(ɨ [ɨ])^{1}	u [u]
Close-mid	e [e]		o [o]
Open-mid	ɛ [ɛ]		ɔ [ɔ]
Open	ä [æ]	a [a]	

1. [ɨ] is only attested in a few words dated to the 18th century, and can be considered an allophone of [i].

Vajda 2024 gives a different vowel system for Kott, based on Castrén 1858.

Vowels of 19th-century Kott
	Front		Central		Back	
	short	long	short	long	short	long
Close	i [i]	î [iː]			u [u]	û [uː]
Mid	e [e]	ê [eː]			o [o]	ô [oː]
Open			a [a]	â [aː]		

=== Consonants ===
Consonants according to Werner 1990
		Labial	Dental	Palatal	Velar	Uvular	Pharyngeal	Laryngeal
Occlusive	plain	p [p]	t [t]	tʼ [tʲ]	k [k]	q [q]		? [ʔ]
Occlusive	aspirated	pʰ [pʰ]	tʰ [tʰ]					
Occlusive	voiced	b [b]	d [d]	dʼ [dʲ]	g [g]	G [ɢ]		
Fricative	voiceless	f [f]	s [s] š [ʃ]		x [x]	X [χ]	ħ [ħ]	h [h]
Fricative	voiced					R [ʀ]		
Affricate	voiceless			č [t͡ʃ]				
Affricate	voiced			dž [d͡ʒ]				
Nasal		m [m]	n [n]	nʼ [nʲ]	ŋ [ŋ]			
Approximant				j [j]				
Lateral			l [l] lʼ [lʲ]					
Trill			r [r]					

Consonants in Kott according to Werner 1997
		Labial	Dental	Postalveolar	Palatal	Velar	Uvular	Laryngeal/ Pharyngeal
Plosive	plain	p [p]	t [t]		tʼ [tʲ]	k [k]	q [q]	ʔ [ʔ]
Plosive	aspirated	pʰ [pʰ]	tʰ [tʰ]					
Plosive	voiced	b [b]	d [d]		dʼ [dʲ]	g [g]	G [ɢ]	
Fricative	voiceless	f [f]	s [s]	š [ʃ]	j [j]	x [x]	χ [χ]	h [h]
Fricative	voiced							
Affricate					č [t͡ʃ]			
Lateral			l [l]	lʼ [lʲ]				
Trill			r [r]					
Nasal		m [m]	n [n]		nʼ [nʲ]	ŋ [ŋ]		

Consonants as recorded by Castren 1858 are presented below. Allophones are presented next to their grapheme.

Consonants of 19th-century Kott
		Labial	Alveolar	Palato-alveolar	Palatal	Velar	Uvular	Glottal
Plosive	plain	p [p]	t [t]		tʼ [tʲ]	k [k]/[g]	q [𐞥χ]/[χ]	
Plosive	aspirated		tʰ [tʰ]/[t]					
Plosive	voiced	b [b]						
Fricative		f [f]/[p]/[pʰ]	s [s]	š [ʃ]/[t͡ʃ]		x [x]		h [h]/[g]/[k]
Affricate				č [t͡ʃ]				
Liquid			l [l]/[lʲ]					
Liquid			r [r]		j [j]/[dʲ]			ʔ [ʔ]
Liquid		m [m]	n [n]/[nʲ]			ŋ [ŋ]		

== Grammar ==
Kott has special end markings to indicate that the noun being described is a hydronym which are -šet/-čet.

Kott is an agglutinative, polysynthetic language which typically uses SVO word order, but can vary depending on situation. It uses suffixes, prefixes and infixes in its verbal inflection, however suffixation is more common than infixation. Personal-subject verbal indicators are usually suffixed to the verb form, and personal-objective indicators are affixed.

=== Case ===
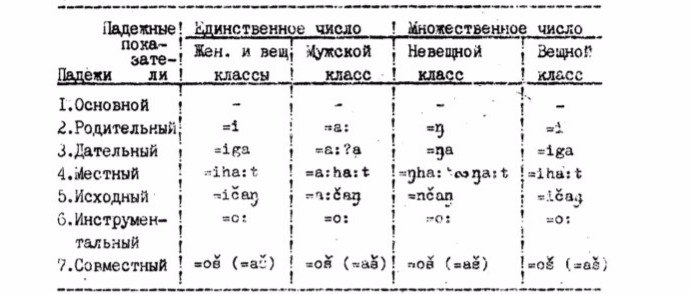
Cases in Kott according to Castrén

Kott has 7 cases. The dative, ablative and locative cases developed from possessed nouns, similarly to Ket and Yugh.

Kott cases in Verner 1990
	singular		plural	
	feminine and neuter	masculine	inanimate	animate
Basic	-∅			
Genitive	=i	=aː	=ŋ	=i
Dative	=iga	=aːʔa	=ŋa	=iga
Locative	=ihaːt	=aːhaːt	=ŋhaː ~ =ŋaːt	=ihaːt
Ablative	=ičaŋ	=aːčaŋ	=nčaŋ	=ičaŋ
Instrumental	=oː	=oː	=oː	=oː
Comitative	=oš (=aš)	=oš (=aš)	=oš (=aš)	=oš (=aš)

== Lexicon ==
Kott had been influenced by Turkic languages, and had borrowed some words from Turkic languages. For example Kott baktîr- ‘to praise’ comes from Proto-Turkic *paktïr (based on phonetics, likely loaned from Kumandin or Shor), or Kott kolá ‘copper, brass’ comes from Proto-Turkic *kola (of which the source is not phonetically identifiable). At the time of its extinction, it was also loaning words from Russian.
