= Kott people =

Kotts
Kott: kottuen; Kott: котюан

Total population
- merged into Russians and Buryats

Languages
- Russian language, Buryat language, Kott language (historically)

Related ethnic groups
- Asan people, Arin people, Ket people, Yugh people, other Yeniseian peoples

The Kott people were a nomadic Yeniseian-speaking people in Siberia, living along the Kan and Biryusa rivers. They were closely related to the Asan people (who are also extinct). They spoke the Kott language, which went extinct in the 1850s.

== Culture ==
The Kotts were primarily hunter-gatherer-fishers, with some cattle and horse breeding in the 19th century. They were known for their iron tools, and had developed blacksmithing.

== History ==
In the early 17th century, the Kotts lived along the Kan, Biryusa, and upper reaches of the Abakan, Mrassu and Kondoma rivers, and the latter is assumed to have been originally Kott. They previously settled from the Uda and Chuna basins in the east to the Tom basin in the west. By the 1850s, the Kotts had assimilated into the neighbouring population of southern Samoyeds, Turkic peoples, Buryats and Russians. They were tributaries of the Russian tsar, as well as the Tuba and Kyrgyz princes, who also collected tribute for the Altan Khan and the Dzungar Khan. Furs, tools and other valuable things were taken from them.

They numbered around 860 people in the mid-17th century, according to Boris Dolgikh. Other sources, however, report around a thousand Kotts. They were almost entirely assimilated into the Russians and Buryats by the time of Matthias Castrén's visits in the 1840s. By then, there were only 76 Kotts, and just 4 of them spoke the language. The remaining Kotts founded a village along the banks of the Agul river, as Indigenous peoples of Siberia had to pay less tribute than Russians.

== Dené–Yeniseian connection ==
For a long time there have been efforts to link the Yeniseian and the Na–Dené people group of North America. In 2008, Edward Vajda of Western Washington University presented evidence for a genealogical relation between the Yeneisian languages of Siberia and the Na–Dené languages of North America. At the time of publication (2010), Vajda's proposals had been favorably reviewed by several specialists of Na-Dené and Yeniseian languages—although at times with caution—including Michael Krauss, Jeff Leer, James Kari, and Heinrich Werner, as well as a number of other respected linguists, such as Bernard Comrie, Johanna Nichols, Victor Golla, Michael Fortescue, Eric Hamp, and Bill Poser (Kari and Potter 2010:12). One significant exception is the critical review of the volume of collected papers by Lyle Campbell and a response by Vajda published in late 2011 that clearly indicate the proposal is not completely settled at the present time. Two other reviews and notices of the volume appeared in 2011 by Keren Rice and Jared Diamond.

== See also ==
- Demographics of Siberia
- Indigenous peoples of Siberia
- Lists of indigenous peoples of Russia
- Yeniseian people
- Ket people

== Bibliography ==
- Андреевский, Иван Ефимович; Арсеньев, Константин Константинович; Петрушевский, Фёдор Фомич (eds.). "Котты". Энциклопедический словарь Брокгауза и Ефрона.
- "КОТТЫ". Советская историческая энциклопедия. Vol. 7. ISBN 9781948192828.
- Werner, Heinrich (1990). Kottskij jazyk Коттский язык [Kott language] (in Russian). Taganrogskij Radiotechničeskij Institut Imeni V. D. Kalmykova. Rostov-na-Donu: Izdat. Rostovskogo univ. ISBN 978-5-7507-0357-9.
