= Assan language =

Yeniseian language

Assan
- kottuen
- Native to: Russia
- Region: Krasnoyarsk Krai
- Ethnicity: Asan people
- Extinct: 1790
- Language family: Yeniseian: Kottic; Assan

Language codes
- ISO 639-3: xss (merged into Kott zko)
- Glottolog: assa1266
- IETF: xss
- Map of pre-contact Yeniseian languages.

Assan (Russian: Ассанский язык) is an extinct Yeniseian language spoken to the south of Krasnoyarsk in Russia. It went extinct in the 18th century. It is similar enough to the Kott language that it can be regarded as a dialect of it, but the Assan identified as a separate ethnicity from the Kotts.

Before its extinction, in 1735-1740, there were two to three speakers of Assan.

== Classification ==
It has been difficult to properly classify the Yeniseian languages into a larger family. It is only recently that a possible link to the Na-Dené languages, a family of Indigenous language of the Americas spoken in Alaska, Western Canada and the southwestern United States, was suggested by Heinrich Werner. According to this argument, the Yeniseian and Na-Dené languages form two branches of an ancient family represented on both sides of the Bering Strait: the Dené–Yeniseian languages.

Assan itself was very close to Kott, another extinct Yeniseian language, such that Assan is usually represented as a dialect of Kott. However, due to its poor attestation, its status is unclear.

== Phonology ==
=== Vowels ===
Vowels of Assan
	Front	Central	Back
Close	i	ɨ	u
Close-mid	e		o
Open-mid	ɛ	(ʌ)	ɔ
Open	æ	a	

=== Consonants ===
Consonants of Assan
			Labial	Dental	Palatal/ Postalveolar	Velar	Uvular	Laryngeal/ Pharyngeal
Plosive	voiceless	plain	p	t	(tʲ)	k	q	(ʔ)
Plosive	voiceless	aspirated	(pʰ)	(tʰ)				
Plosive	voiced		b	d	(dʲ)	g	ɢ	
Fricative	voiceless			(s)	ʃ	x	χ	h
Fricative	voiced		(v)					
Affricate	voiceless				t͡ʃ			
Affricate	voiced				d͡ʒ			
Nasal			m	n		ŋ		
Lateral				l				
Approximant					j			
Trill				r				

== Sources ==
- (ru) Г.К. Вернер (Heinrich Werner), Енисейскиe языки, dans Языки Мира, Палеоазиатские Языки, pp. 169–177, Moscou, Izd. Indrik, 1997 ISBN 5-85759-046-9.
- (ru) Г.С. Старостин, К.Ю. Решетников, Кетский сборник. Лингвистика, Moscou, Vostotchnaya Literatura RAN, 1995 ISBN 5-88766-023-6.
