= Asan people =

Asans
kottuen

Total population
- merged into Evenks and Russians

Regions with significant populations
- southern Siberia, along the Yenisey

Languages
- Evenki, Russian, formerly Assan

Related ethnic groups
- Kotts, other Yeniseian people

The Asan or Assan were a Yeniseian speaking, hunter-fisher people in Siberia, distinct from the Kotts. In the 18th and 19th centuries they were assimilated by the Evenki and Russians. They spoke the Assan language, closely related to, and can be considered a dialect of, Kott. The Assans, after their migration down the Yenisei river, settled around the Usolka and Biryusa rivers. By the time of the publication of the Brockhaus and Efron Encyclopedic Dictionary, there were less than 100 scattered families left of them, and they had been Turkicized. The village Asansk, founded in 1897, bears their name.

== Sources ==
- Wixman, Ronald. The Peoples of the USSR: An Ethnographic Handbook. (Armonk, New York: M. E. Sharpe, Inc, 1984) p. 14
