= Semeiskie =

Old Believer community in Buryatia, Russia

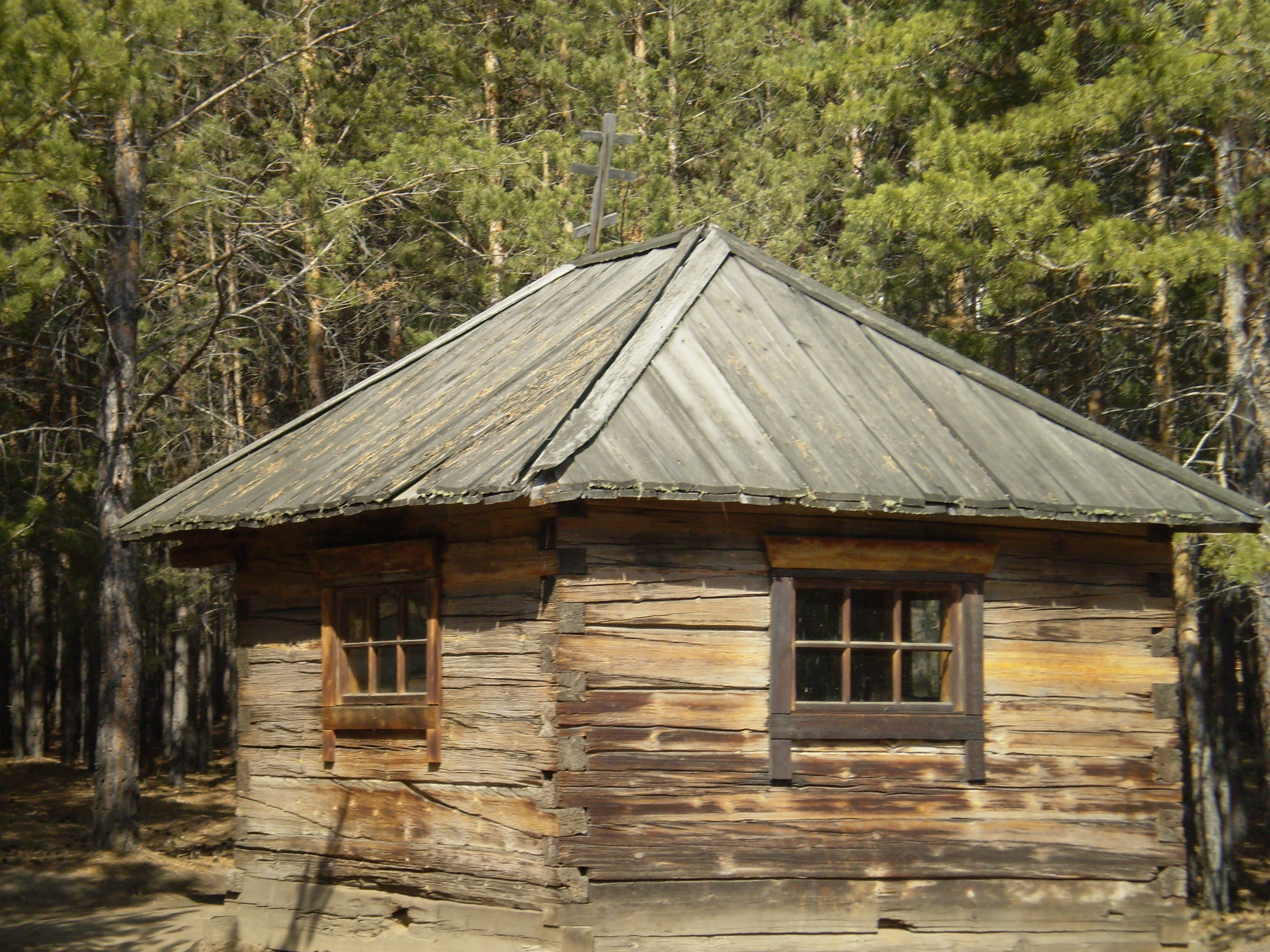
An Old Believers chapel at the Ulan-Ude Ethnographic Museum in Buryatia

The Semeiskie are a community of orthodox Old Believers who have lived in the Transbaikal since the reign of Catherine the Great. The sacred rites and rituals of the Old Believers came to be in opposition to those of the official state church after the introduction of the 17th century religious reforms known as the Raskol. Those who rejected the reforms became known as "Old Believers" (mostly, the Russian Old-Orthodox Church) and continued to practice their faith despite repression. The Semeiskie were a particular group of Old Believers who fled to Gomel in Belarus (at that time part of Poland). Catherine the Great then exiled the group to Buryatia, on the pretext that they could there become farmers for the Cossack guards who defended the borders of the empire. The descendants of these original Semeiskie have lived in the region ever since.

== Culture ==
The Semeiskie have a long oral tradition, in speech as well as vocal music. The Semeiskie songs are notable for their polyphonic dissonance in both sacred and secular music. The themes of the songs vary widely, from religious texts to everyday songs. The cultural space and oral culture of the Semeiskie was placed on the UNESCO List of the Intangible Cultural Heritage of Humanity in 2001.
