= Ulan-Ude =

City in the Republic of Buryatia, Russia

Ulan-Ude Улан-Удэ
- City

Other transcription(s)
  - Buryat: Улаан-Үдэ
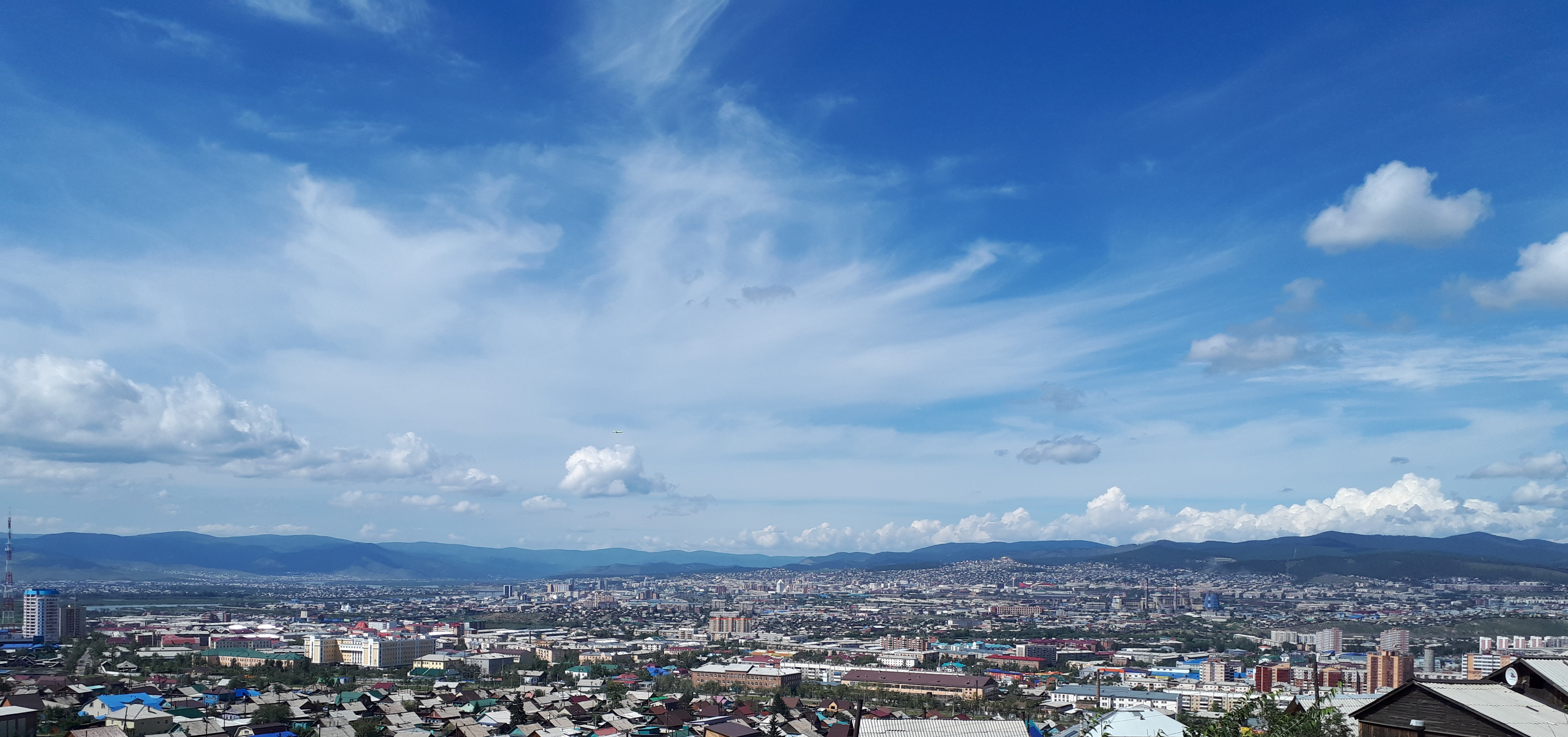
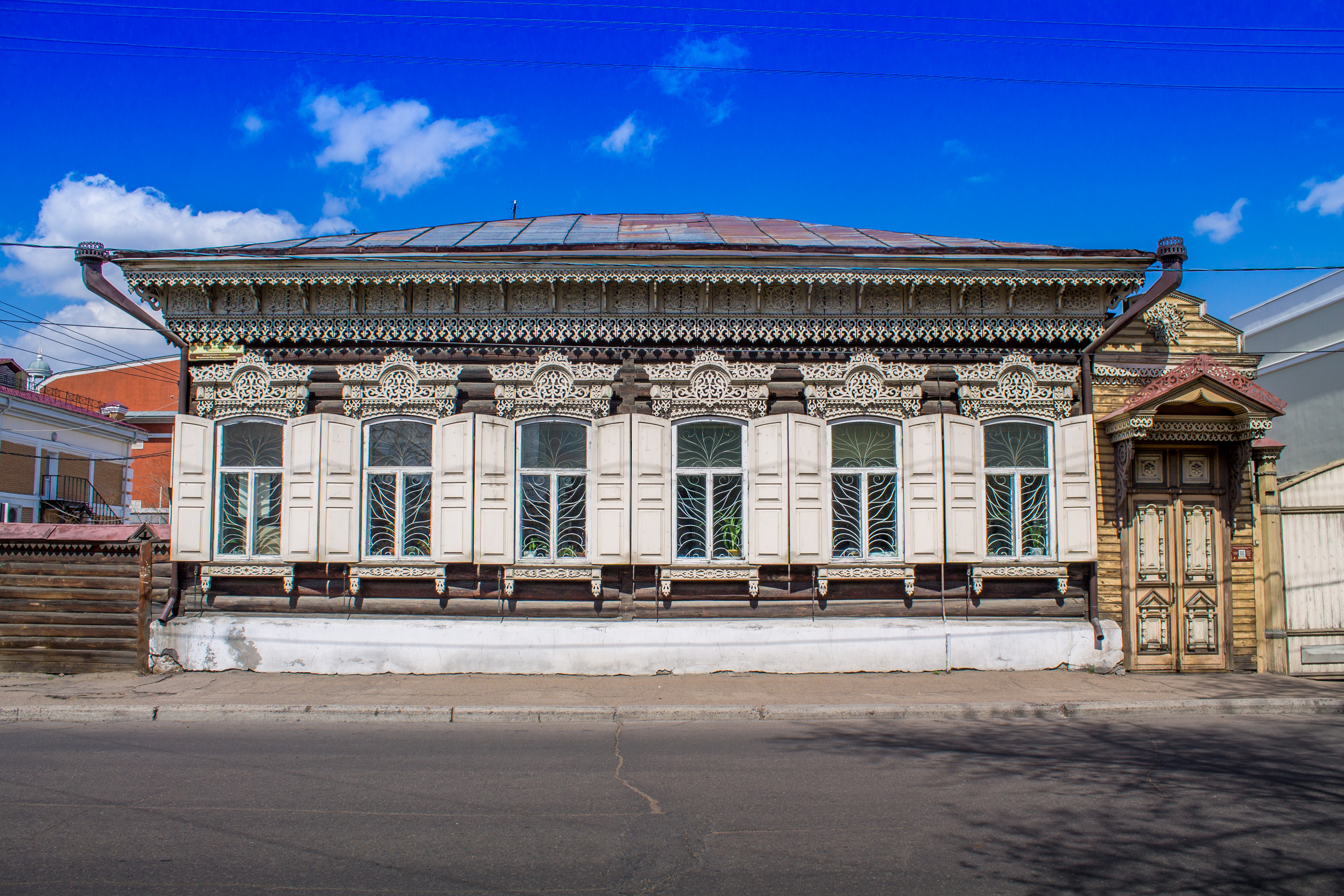
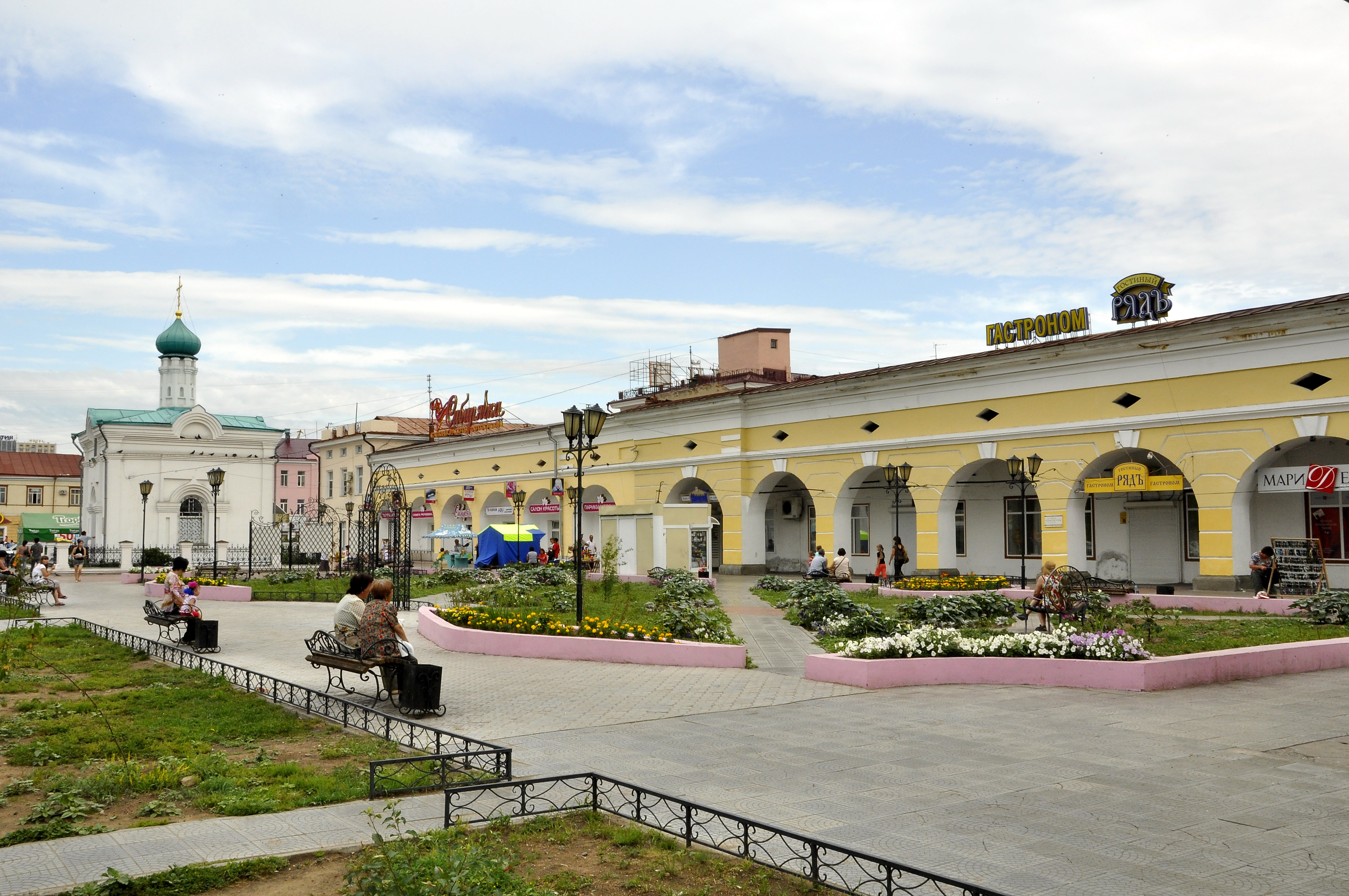
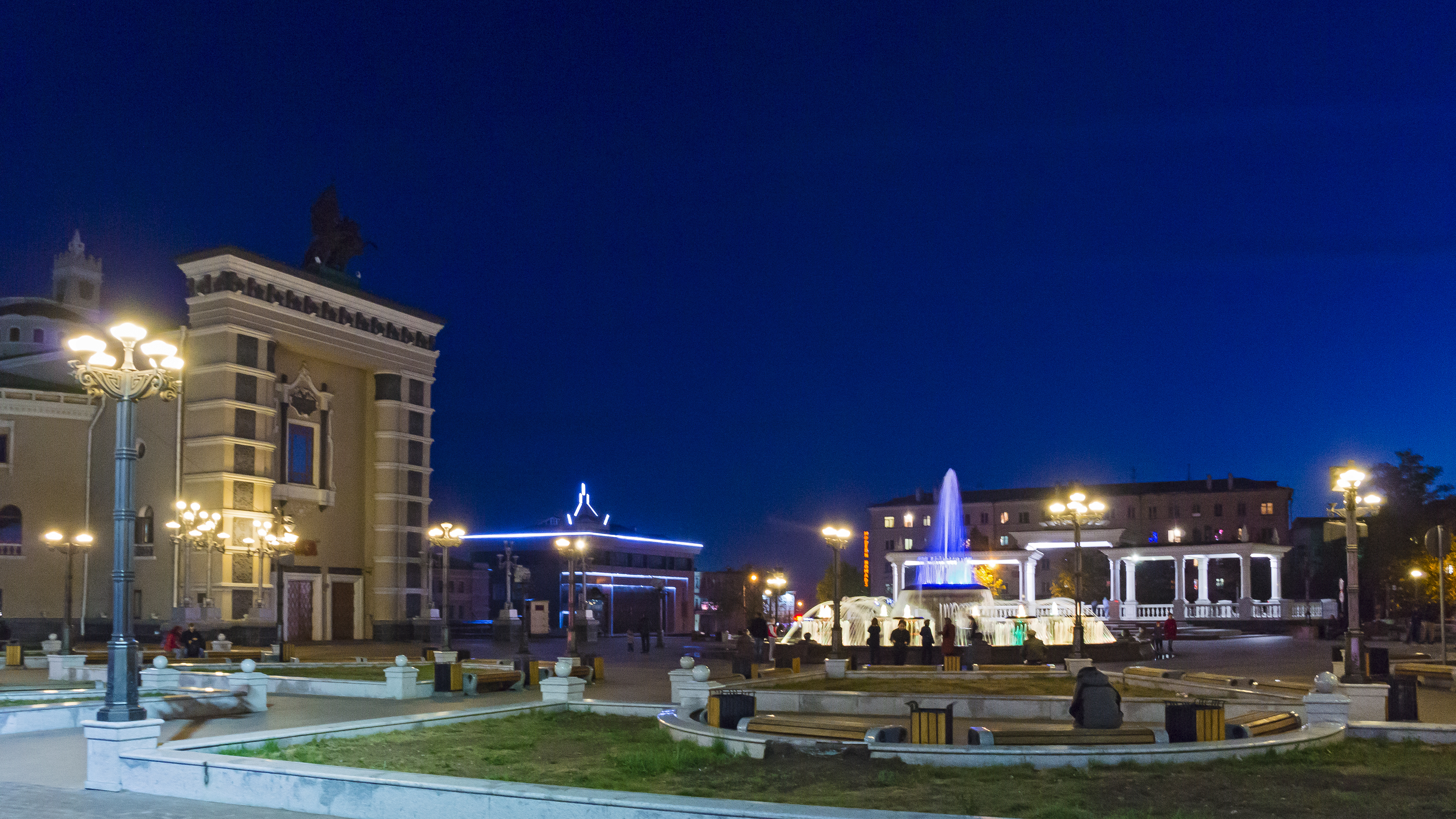
- Panorama of Ulan-Ude Historic residential building on Banzarov Street Gostiny Dvor Theatre Square Odigitrievsky Cathedral

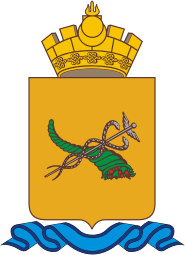
- Flag Coat of arms
- Anthem: Anthem of Ulan-Ude
- Interactive map of Ulan-Ude
- Location of Ulan-Ude Ulan-Ude (Russia) Ulan-Ude (Asia) Ulan-Ude (Earth)
- Coordinates: 51°50′N 107°36′E
- Country: Russia
- Federal subject: Buryatia
- Founded: 1666
- City status since: 1775

Government
  - Body: City Council of Deputies
  - Mayor: Igor Shutenkov

Area
  - Total: 347.6 km^{2} (134.2 sq mi)
- Elevation: 500 m (1,600 ft)

Population (2010 Census)
  - Total: 404,426
  - Estimate (2025): 435,067 (+7.6%)
  - Rank: 45th in 2010
  - Density: 1,163/km^{2} (3,013/sq mi)

Administrative status
  - Subordinated to: city of republic significance of Ulan-Ude
  - Capital of: Republic of Buryatia
  - Capital of: city of republic significance of Ulan-Ude

Municipal status
  - Urban okrug: Ulan-Ude Urban Okrug
  - Capital of: Ulan-Ude Urban Okrug
- Time zone: UTC+8 (MSK+5)
- Postal code: 6700xx
- Dialing code: +7 3012
- OKTMO ID: 81701000001
- City Day: September's first Saturday
- Website: ulan-ude-eg.ru

Ulan-Ude (/ʊˈlɑːnʊˈdɛ/; Russian: Улан-Удэ, Russian pronunciation: [ʊˈlan ʊˈdɛ]; Buryat: Улаан-Үдэ, romanized: Ulaan-Üde, IPA: [ʊˌlaːɴ‿ˈʉdə]) is the capital city of Buryatia, Russia, located about 100 kilometers (62 mi) southeast of Lake Baikal on the Uda River at its confluence with the Selenga. According to the 2021 Census, 437,565 people lived in Ulan-Ude; up from 404,426 recorded in the 2010 Census, making the city the third-largest in the Russian Far East by population.

== Names ==
Ulan-Ude was first called Udinskoye (Удинское, [ˈudʲɪnskəjə]) for its location on the Uda River. It was founded as a small fort in 1666. From around 1735, the settlement was called Udinsk (Удинск, [ʊˈdʲinsk]) and was granted town status under that name in 1775. It was renamed Verkhneudinsk (Верхнеудинск, [vʲɪrxnʲɪˈudʲɪnsk]; "Upper Udinsk") in 1783, to differentiate it from Nizhneudinsk ("Lower Udinsk") lying on a different Uda River near Irkutsk which was granted town status that year.

The descriptors "upper" and "lower" refer to the positions of the two cities relative to each other, rather than the location of the cities on their respective Uda rivers. Verkhneudinsk lies at the mouth of its river, while Nizhneudinsk is along the middle stretch. The current name was given to the city on 27 July 1934 and means "red Uda" in Buryat, reflecting the ideology of the Communist Party of the Soviet Union.

== Geography ==
Ulan-Ude lies 5,640 kilometers (3,500 mi) east of Moscow and 100 kilometers (62 mi) southeast of Lake Baikal. It is 600 meters (2,000 ft) above sea level at the foot of the Khamar-Daban and Ulan-Burgas mountain ranges, next to the confluence of the Selenga River and its tributary, the Uda, which divides the city.

=== Hydrography ===
Ulan-Ude is traversed by two rivers, the Selenga and Uda. The Selenga provides the greatest inflow to Baikal Lake, supplying 50% of all rivers in its basin. The Selenga brings about 30 cubic kilometers (7 cubic miles) of water into the lake per year, exerting a major influence on the lakewater's renewal and its sanitary condition. Selenga is the habitat of the most valuable fish species such as Omul, Siberian sturgeon, Siberian taimen, Thymallus and Coregonus.

Uda is the right inflow of the Selenga river. The length of the watercourse is 467 kilometers (290 miles).

== History ==
The first occupants of the area where Ulan-Ude now stands were the Evenks and, later, the Buryat Mongols. Ulan-Ude was settled in 1666 by the Russian Cossacks as the fortress of Udinskoye. Due to its favorable geographical position, it grew rapidly and became a large trade center which connected Russia with China and Mongolia and, from 1690, was the administrative center of the Transbaikal region.

By 1775, it was known as Udinsk, and in 1783 it was granted city status and renamed Verkhneudinsk. After a large fire in 1878, the city was almost completely rebuilt. The Trans-Siberian Railway reached the city in 1900 causing an explosion in growth. The population, which was 3,500 in 1880, reached 126,000 in 1939.

From 6 April to October 1920, Verkhneudinsk was the capital of the Far Eastern Republic, also known as the Chita Republic. It was a nominally independent state that existed from April 1920 to November 1922 in the easternmost part of the Russian Far East. On 27 July 1934, the city was renamed Ulan-Ude.

Following the dissolution of the Soviet Union, a period of rapid and uncontrolled illegal construction of private houses on officially designated agricultural land began. This phenomenon became known as Nakhalovki. Due to the deteriorating economic situation in the region, the city of Ulan-Ude emerged as a favourable destination for internal migration. However, the growing population was met with a supply of formal housing which was not enough to accommodate the growth of the city population, which in turn fuelled the spread of Nakhalovki districts in the city suburbs. The uncontrolled growth of those districts makes them suffer from lack of necessary infrastructure.

== Administrative and municipal status ==
Ulan-Ude is the capital of the republic. Within the framework of administrative divisions, it is incorporated as the city of republic significance of Ulan-Ude — an administrative unit with the status equal to that of the districts. As a municipal division, the city of Ulan-Ude is incorporated as Ulan-Ude Urban Okrug.

Ulan-Ude is divided into three subdivisions.

- Sovietsky District
- Zheleznodorozhny District
- Octyabirsky District

== Demographics ==
Historical population
Year	Pop.	±%
1897	8,086	—
1926	29,425	+263.9%
1939	125,690	+327.2%
1959	175,172	+39.4%
1970	253,569	+44.8%
1979	300,370	+18.5%
1989	352,530	+17.4%
2002	374,854	+6.3%
2010	404,426	+7.9%
2021	437,565	+8.2%
Source: Census data

According to the 2021 Census, 437,565 people lived in Ulan-Ude; up from 404,426 recorded in the 2010 Census. In terms of population, it is the third-largest city in eastern Siberia. It ranks 45th among all cities in Russia. Roughly 600,000 people live in the urban agglomeration.

The ethnic makeup of Ulan-Ude in 2021 was:

- Russians: 61.4%
- Buryats: 35.1%
- Others: 3.5%

The city is the center of Tibetan Buddhism in Russia and the important Ivolginsky datsan is located 23 km (14 mi) from the city.

== Transportation ==
Map of city's municipal bus routes

Ulan-Ude is located on the main line (Trans-Siberian line) of the Trans-Siberian Railway between Irkutsk and Chita at the junction of the Trans-Mongolian line (the Trans-Mongolian Railway) which begins at Ulan Ude and continues south through Mongolia to Beijing in China.

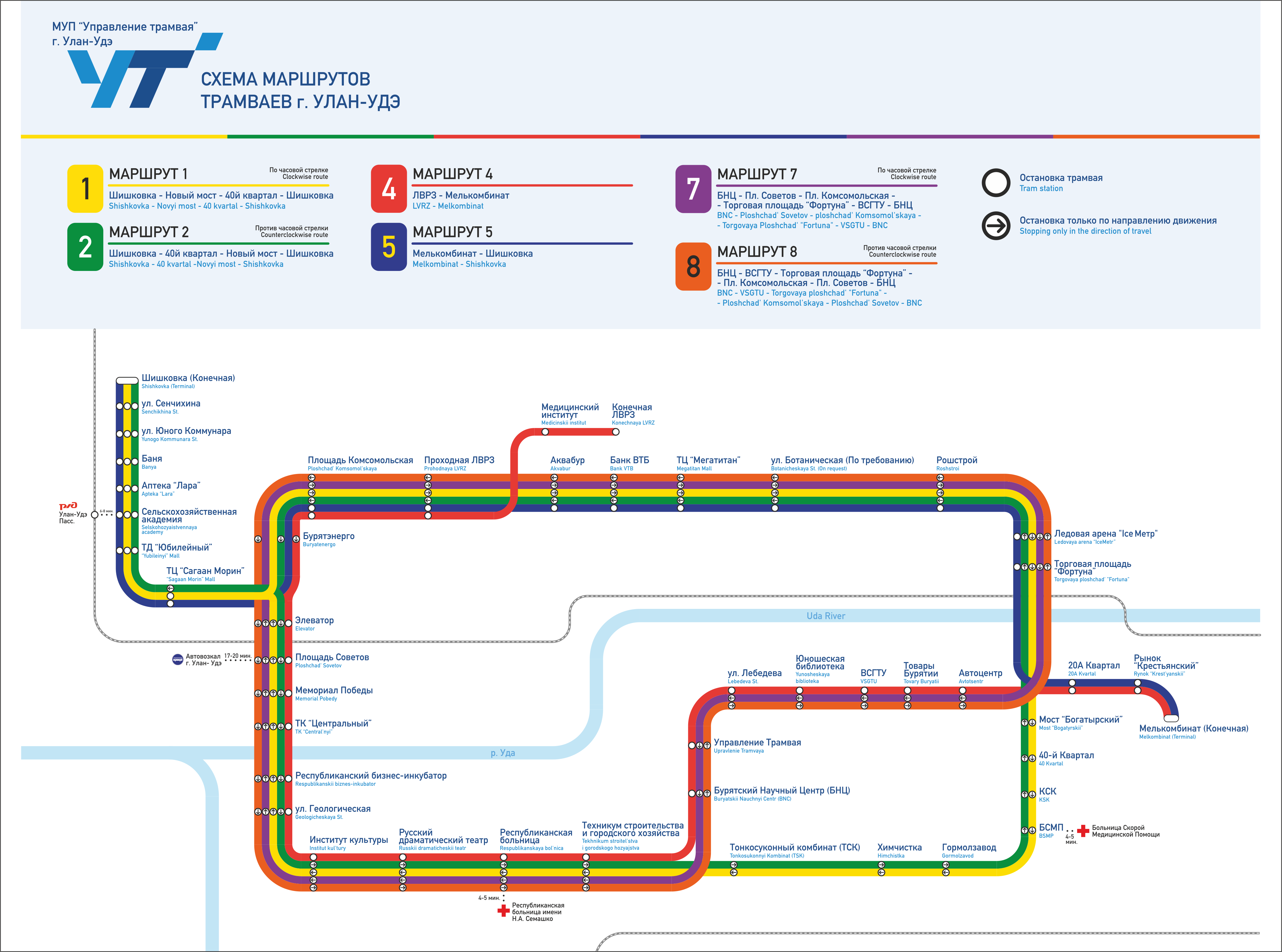
Map of city's tram routes as of October 2021

The city also lies on the M55 section of the Baikal Highway (part of the Trans-Siberian Highway), the main federal road to Vladivostok. Air traffic is served by the Ulan-Ude Airport (Baikal), as well as the smaller Ulan-Ude Vostochny Airport. Intracity transport includes tram, bus, and marshrutka (share taxi) lines.

== Culture ==
Until 1991, Ulan-Ude was closed to foreigners. There are old merchants' mansions richly decorated with wood and stone carving in the historical center of Ulan-Ude, along the river banks which are exceptional examples of Russian classicism. The city has a large ethnographic museum which recalls the history of the peoples of the region. There is a large and highly unusual statue of the head of Vladimir Lenin in the central square: the largest in the world. Built in 1970 for the centennial of Lenin's birth and weighing 42 tons, as of 2018 it continued to tower over the main plaza at 7.7 meters (25 ft).

The Ulger puppet theater was founded in Ulan-Ude in 1967.

== Sights ==
The Ethnographic Museum of the peoples of Transbaikal is one of Russia's largest open-air museums. The museum contains historical finds from the era of the Slab Grave Culture and the Xiongnu until the mid 20th century, including a unique collection of samples of wooden architecture of Siberia.

Odigitrievsky Cathedral – Eastern Orthodox Church Diocese of the Buryat, was the first stone building in the city and is a Siberian baroque architectural monument. The cathedral is considered unique because it is built in a zone of high seismic activity in the heart of the city on the banks of the River Uda River where it flows into the Selenga.

One of the attractions of Ulan-Ude is a monument in the town square — the square of the Soviets — in the form of the head of Lenin (sculptors G.V. Neroda, J.G. Neroda, architects Dushkin, P.G. Zilberman). The monument, weighing 42 tons and with a height of 7.7 meters (25 ft), was opened in 1971 in honor of the centenary of Lenin's birth.

== Climate ==
Ulan-Ude can be described as possessing a humid steppe climate (Köppen climate classification BSk), bordering on a humid continental climate (Dwb) and a subarctic climate (Dwc). The climate is characterized by long, dry, and bitterly cold winters, with light snowfall but persistent snow cover in the city and surrounding areas due to its having such cold winters and thaws being exceptionally rare. In fact, January has never recorded an above-freezing temperature. Summers are relatively long for the city's latitude and climate zone. Lasting from mid-May to early September, they are warm and bring the majority of the annual precipitation in the form of rain.

The record high is 40.6 °C (105.1 °F) on 8 July 2016. The record low is −54.4 °C (−65.9 °F) on 6 January 1931. Temperatures have never risen above freezing from 31 December to 1 February, inclusive.

Climate data for Ulan-Ude (1991–2020 normals, extremes 1847–present)
Month	Jan	Feb	Mar	Apr	May	Jun	Jul	Aug	Sep	Oct	Nov	Dec	Year
Record high °C (°F)	−0.4 (31.3)	7.9 (46.2)	19.8 (67.6)	28.7 (83.7)	35.6 (96.1)	40.0 (104.0)	40.6 (105.1)	39.7 (103.5)	32.2 (90.0)	24.7 (76.5)	11.3 (52.3)	5.2 (41.4)	40.6 (105.1)
Mean daily maximum °C (°F)	−17.6 (0.3)	−10.6 (12.9)	0.4 (32.7)	10.7 (51.3)	18.6 (65.5)	25.5 (77.9)	27.5 (81.5)	24.2 (75.6)	16.8 (62.2)	6.9 (44.4)	−5.2 (22.6)	−14.8 (5.4)	6.9 (44.4)
Daily mean °C (°F)	−22.8 (−9.0)	−17.5 (0.5)	−6.7 (19.9)	3.4 (38.1)	10.9 (51.6)	17.9 (64.2)	20.6 (69.1)	17.7 (63.9)	10.0 (50.0)	0.8 (33.4)	−10.3 (13.5)	−19.4 (−2.9)	0.4 (32.7)
Mean daily minimum °C (°F)	−27.2 (−17.0)	−23.5 (−10.3)	−13.0 (8.6)	−3.0 (26.6)	3.8 (38.8)	11.1 (52.0)	14.6 (58.3)	12.3 (54.1)	4.6 (40.3)	−4.0 (24.8)	−14.4 (6.1)	−23.2 (−9.8)	−5.2 (22.6)
Record low °C (°F)	−54.4 (−65.9)	−44.9 (−48.8)	−40.4 (−40.7)	−28.0 (−18.4)	−15.1 (4.8)	−3.9 (25.0)	1.2 (34.2)	−4.0 (24.8)	−11.4 (11.5)	−27.9 (−18.2)	−38.0 (−36.4)	−48.8 (−55.8)	−54.4 (−65.9)
Average precipitation mm (inches)	5 (0.2)	3 (0.1)	3 (0.1)	6 (0.2)	18 (0.7)	34 (1.3)	64 (2.5)	63 (2.5)	27 (1.1)	7 (0.3)	9 (0.4)	11 (0.4)	250 (9.8)
Average extreme snow depth cm (inches)	12 (4.7)	12 (4.7)	4 (1.6)	0 (0)	0 (0)	0 (0)	0 (0)	0 (0)	0 (0)	0 (0)	3 (1.2)	9 (3.5)	12 (4.7)
Average rainy days	0	0.04	1	6	10	14	16	15	13	7	1	0	83
Average snowy days	15	11	9	8	2	0.03	0	0	1	8	17	18	89
Average relative humidity (%)	77	75	66	53	49	57	64	69	68	68	76	78	67
Mean monthly sunshine hours	115	155	225	248	287	288	270	247	211	167	113	92	2,418
Source 1: Погода и Климат
Source 2: NOAA (sun, 1961-1990)

== Economy ==
The Ulan-Ude Aviation Plant is based in Ulan-Ude.

== Mongol Rally ==
Ulan-Ude serves as the endpoint for the Mongol Rally.

== Notable people ==
- Dmitry Masleev (born 1988), pianist
- Oksana Omelianchik (born 1970), artistic gymnast
- Irina Pantaeva (born 1967), Sports Illustrated model
- Alexander Slastin (born 1942), actor
- Inna Stepanova (born 1990), Olympic archer
- Gunsyn Tsydenova (1909–1994), politician
- Zhamsaran Tsydypov (born 1996), chess grandmaster

== Gallery ==
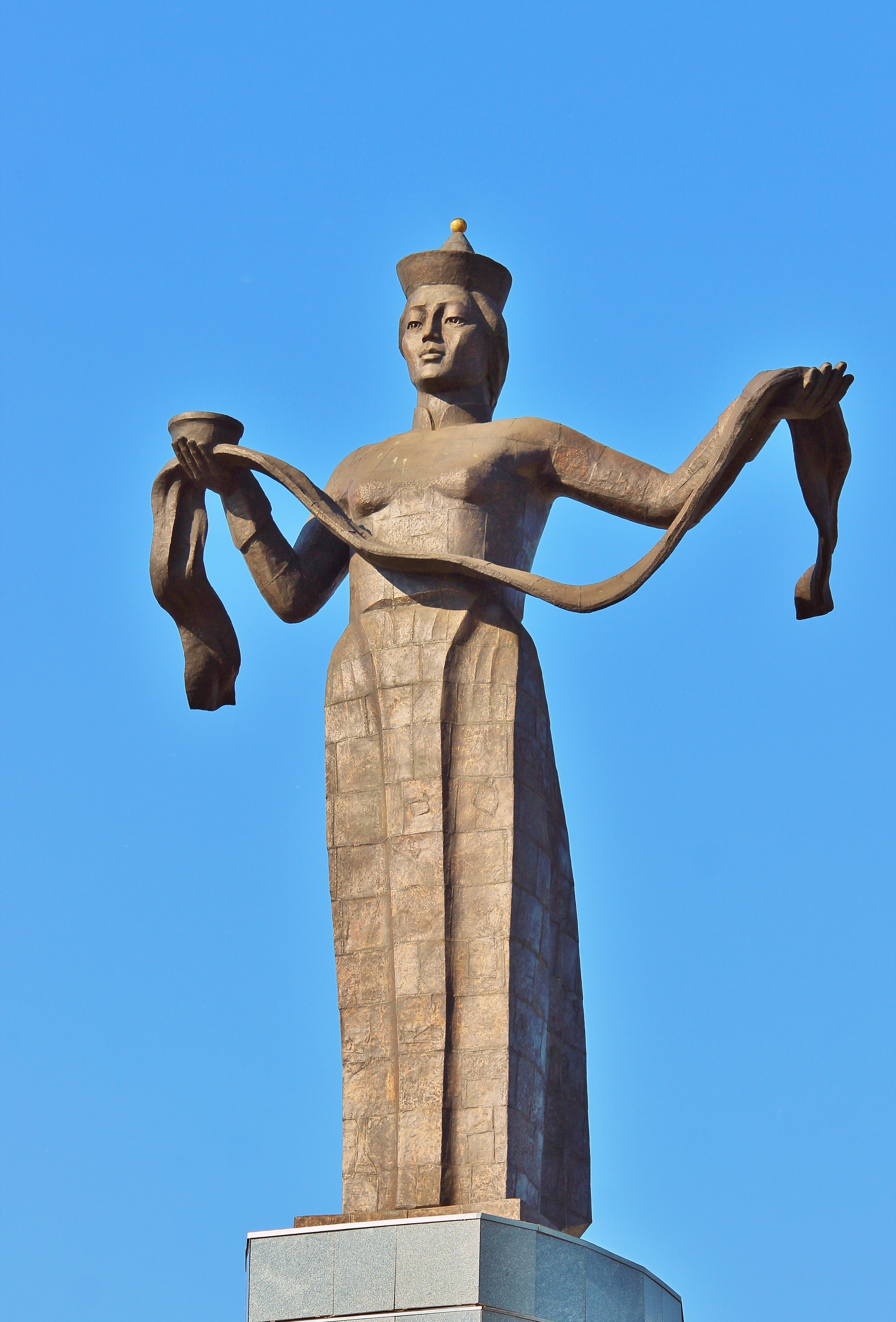
Mother Buryatia statue

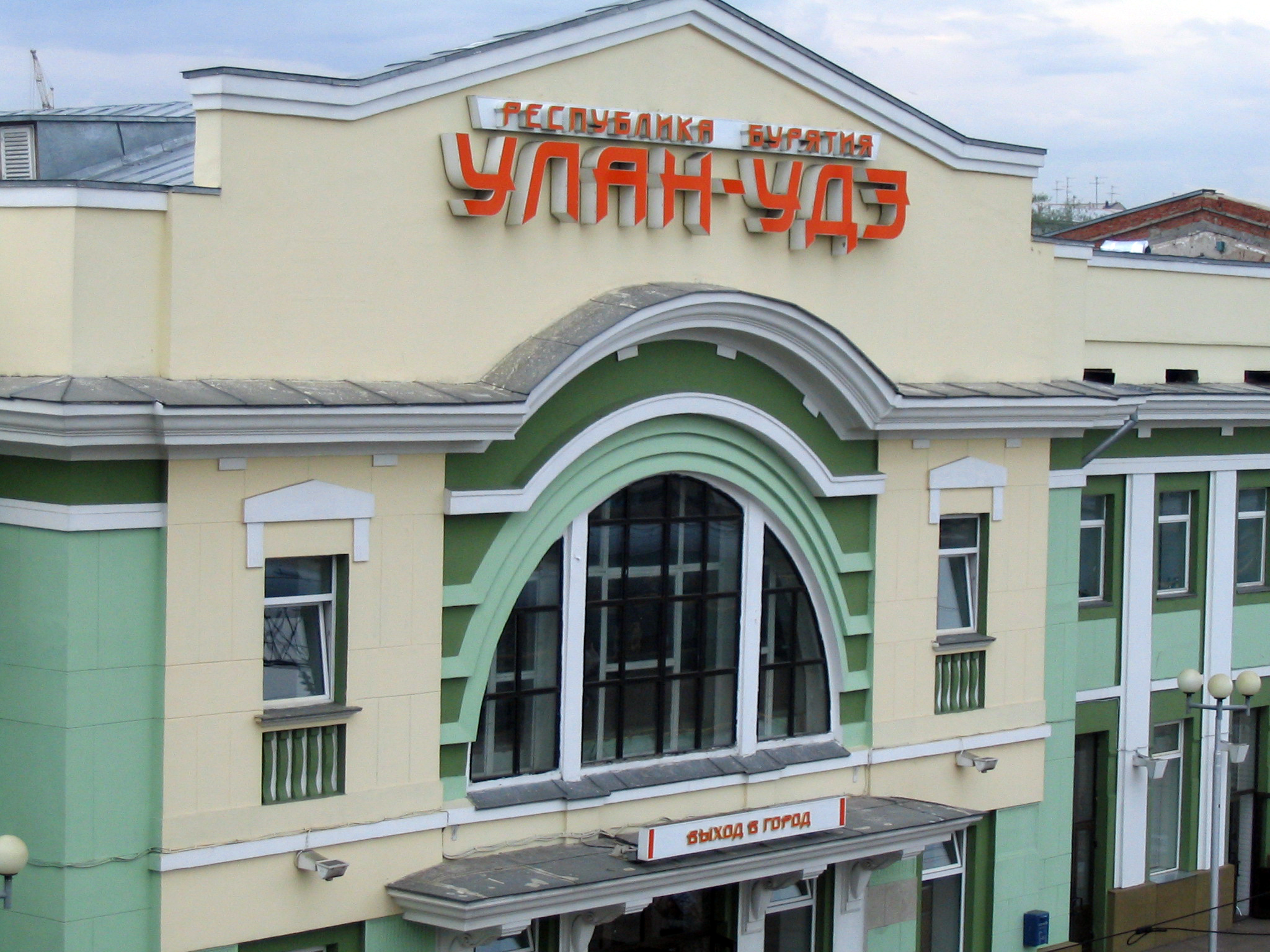
Ulan-Ude railway station on the Trans-Siberian Railway

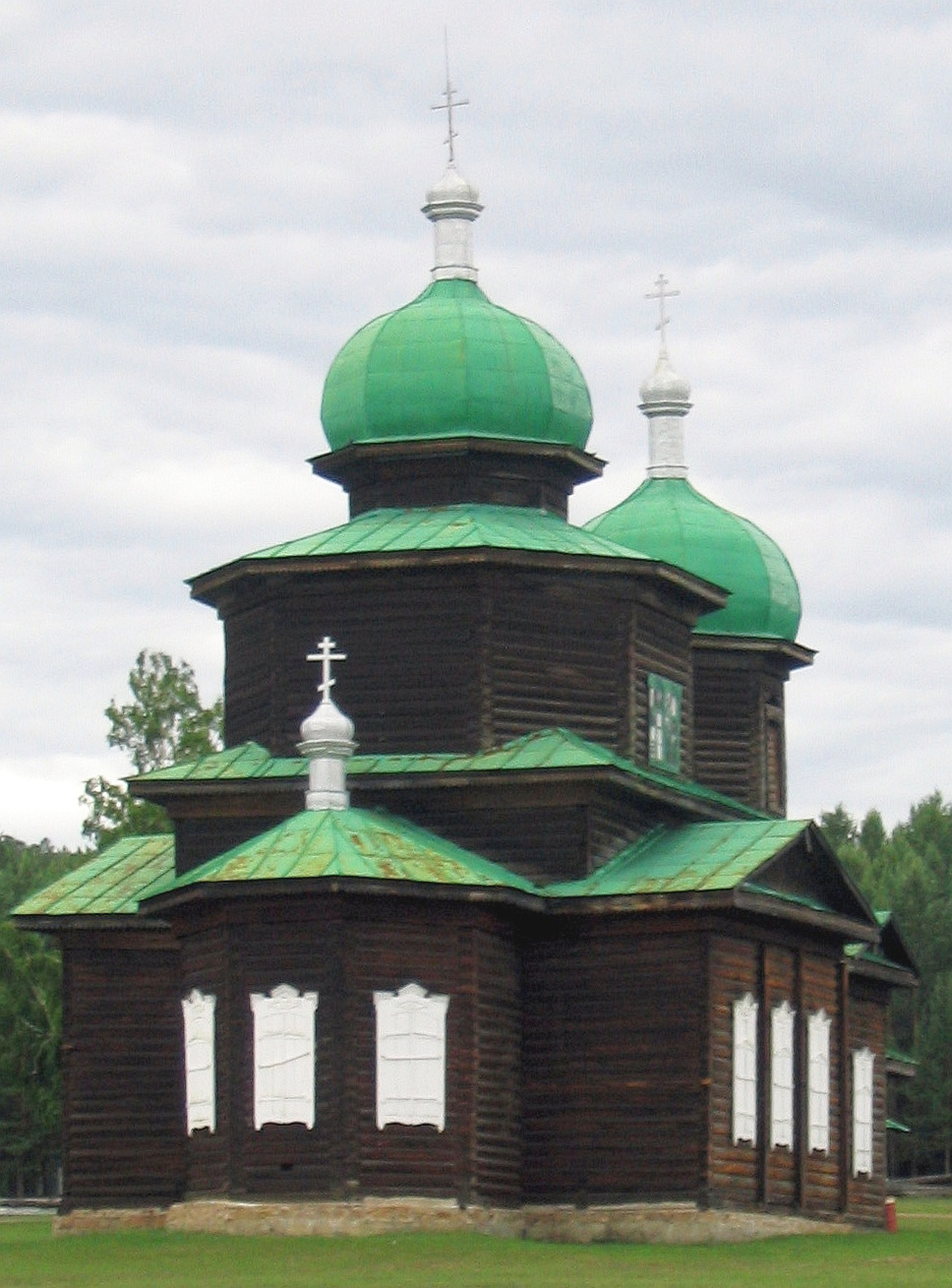
A Russian Old Believer church moved to the ethnographic museum in Ulan-Ude

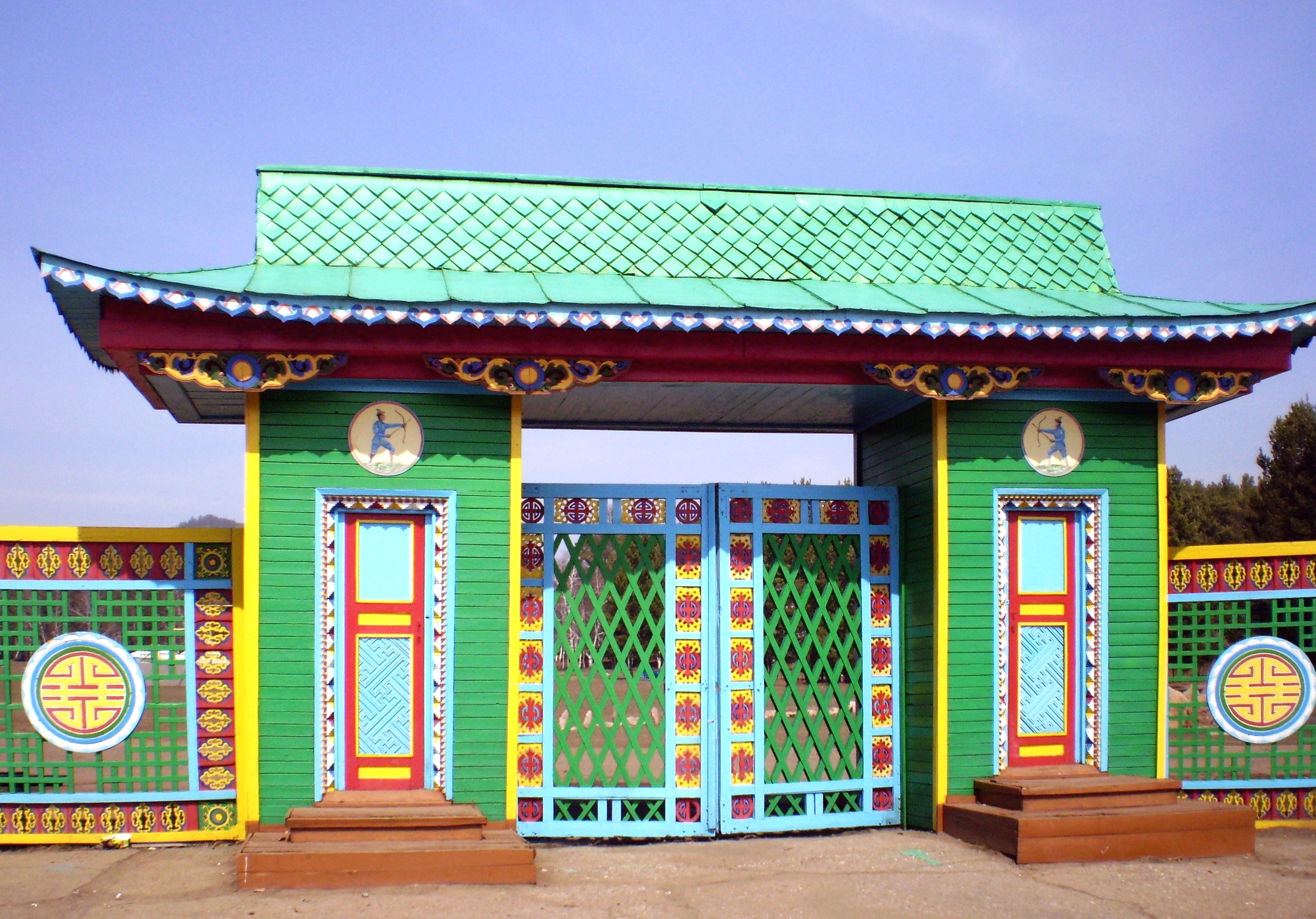
Gate of the Ulan-Ude Ethnographic Museum

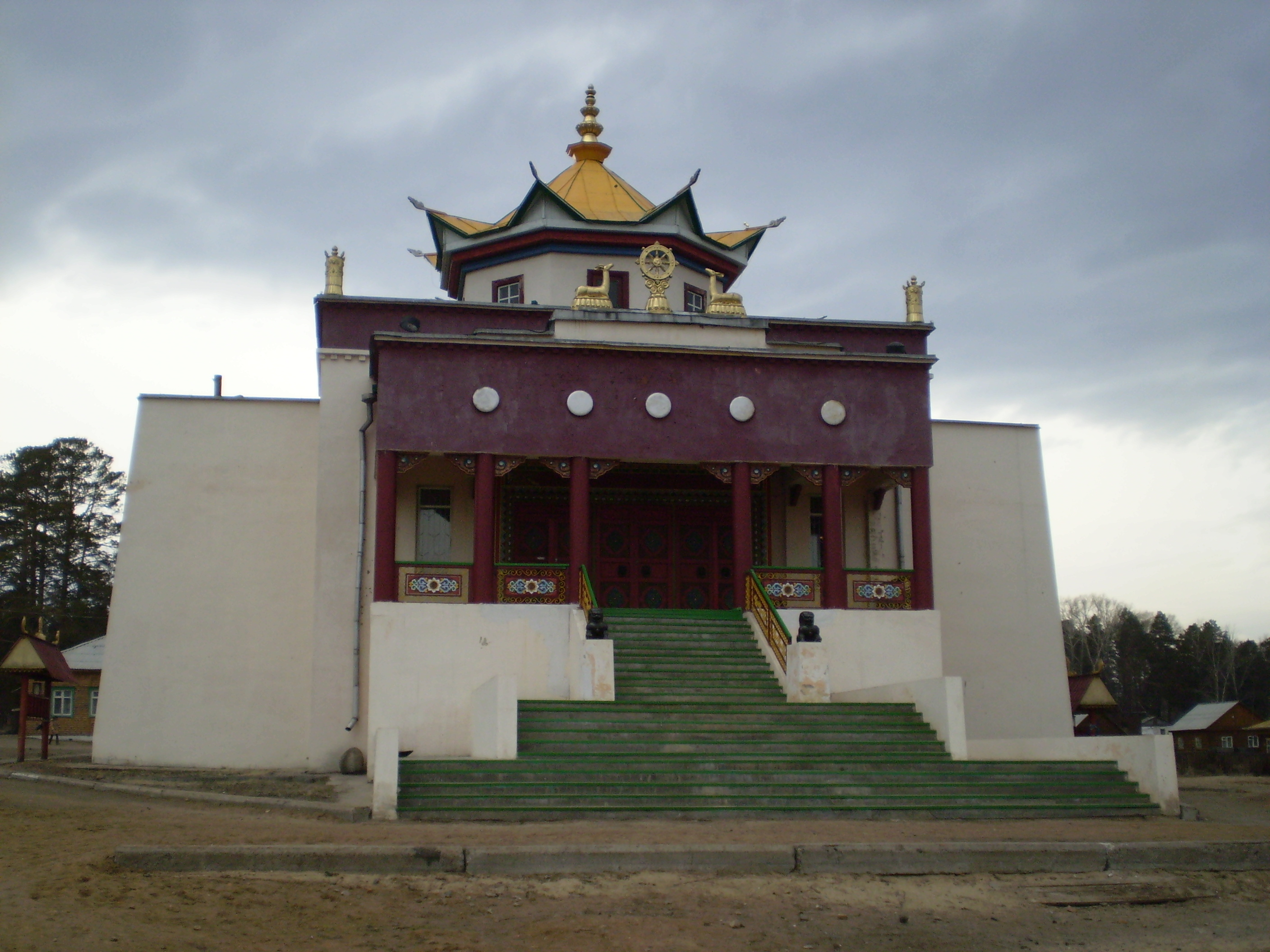
Hambyn-Hure Datsan

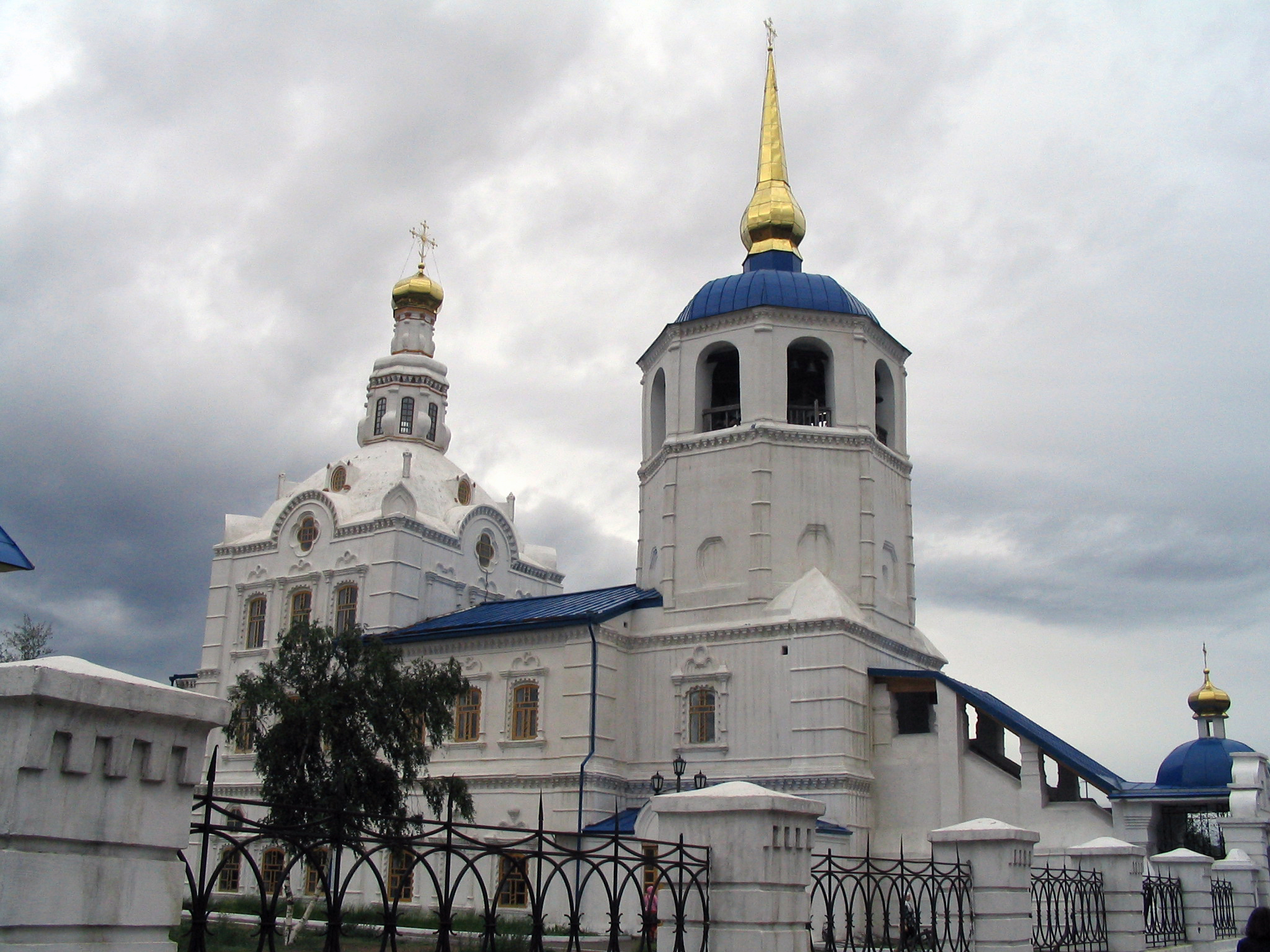
Odigitrievsky Cathedral

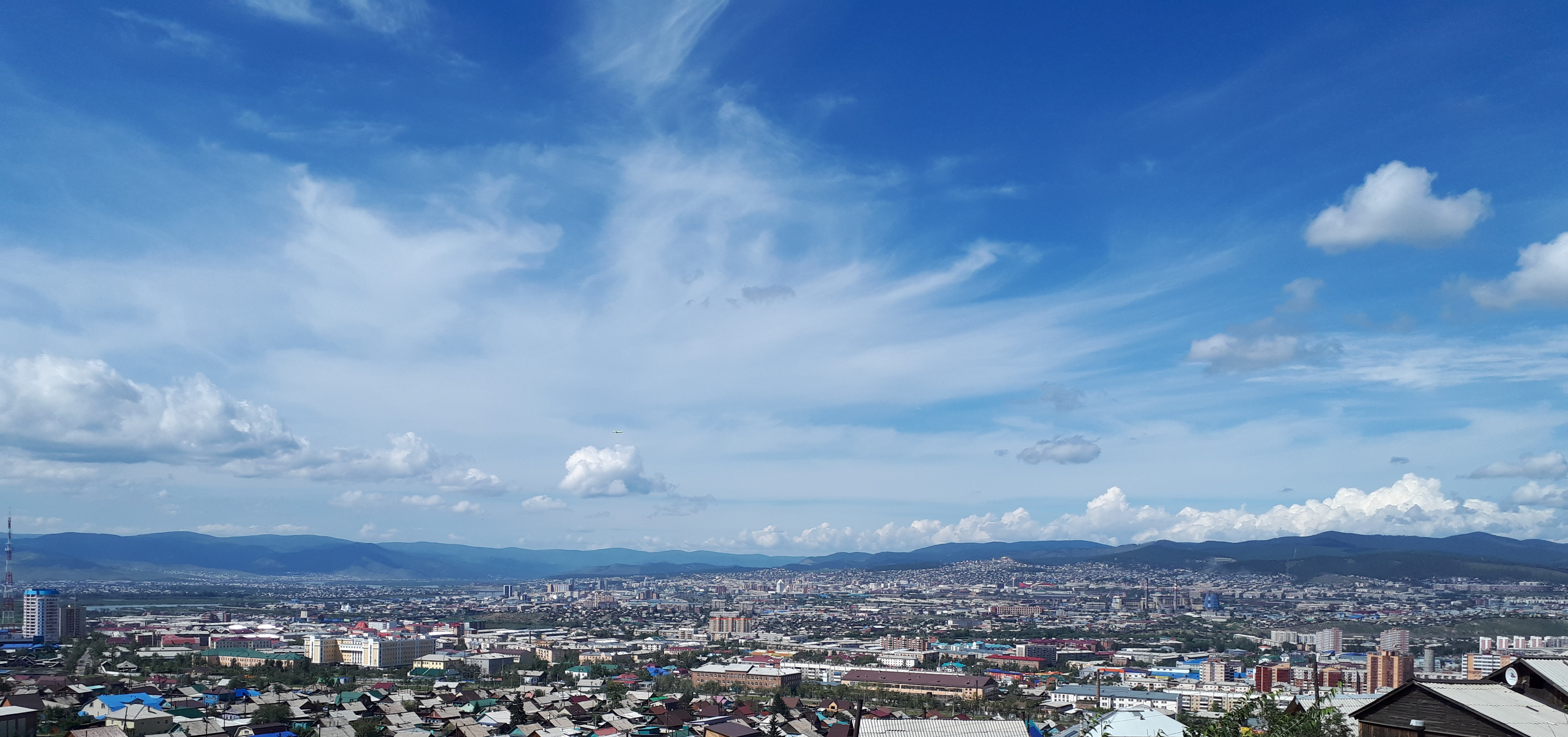
Panorama of Ulan-Ude. View from Mount Komushka

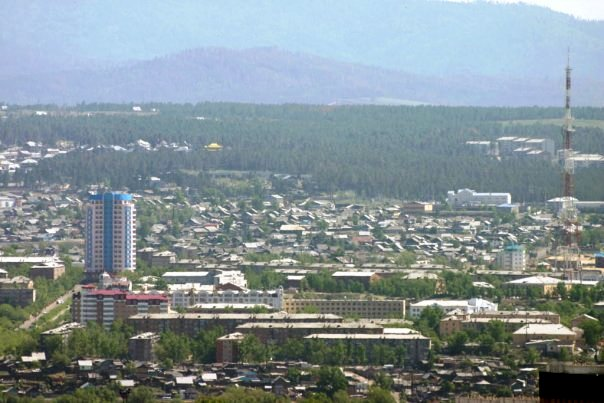
Ulan-Ude

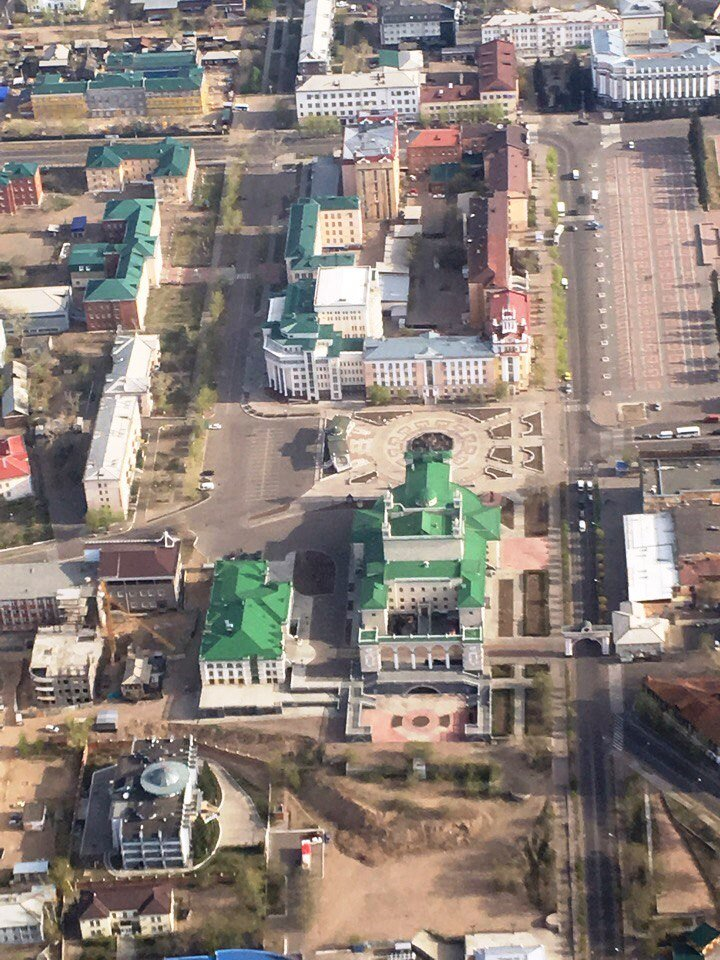
Center of Ulan-Ude from a bird's eye view

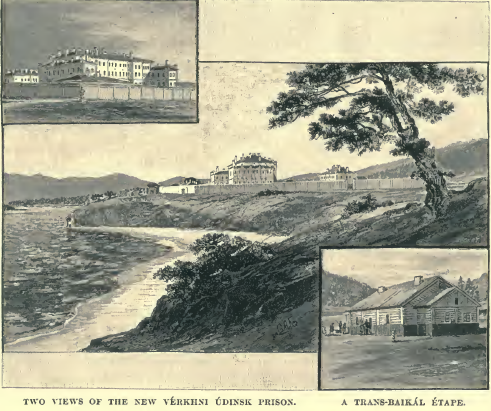
Verkhneudinsk, 1885

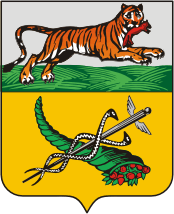
Coat of arms of Verkhneudinsk in 1790
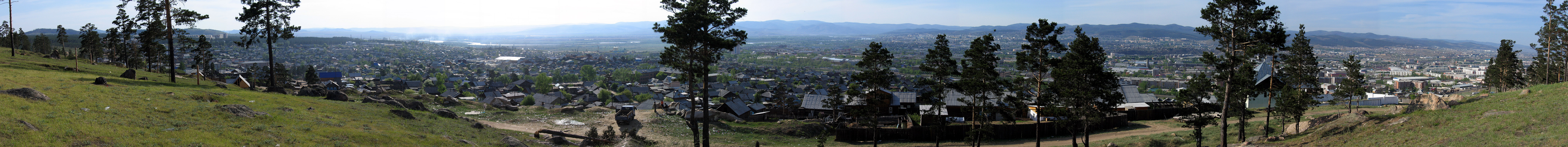
A panorama view of Ulan-Ude

== Twin towns and sister cities ==
Ulan-Ude is twinned with:

- Anyang, South Korea
- (United States) Berkeley, USA
- Changchun, China
- Chita, Russia
- Darkhan, Mongolia
- Donetsk, Ukraine
- Elista, Russia
- Erdenet, Mongolia
- Erenhot, China
- Grozny, Russia
- Haeju, North Korea
- Hohhot, China
- Hulunbuir, China
- Lanzhou, China
- Manzhouli, China
- Rumoi, Japan
- Taipei, Taiwan
- Ulaanbaatar, Mongolia
- Ulanqab, China
- Yalta, Ukraine
- Yamagata, Japan
- Yeongwol County, South Korea
