= Nevanka =

Nevanka Неванка
- Village
- Interactive map of Nevanka
- Location of Nevanka Nevanka (Irkutsk Oblast)
- Coordinates: 56°30′N 98°54′E
- Country: Russia
- Federal subject: Irkutsk Oblast
- Administrative district: Chunsky District

Population
  - Estimate (2012): 2 )
- Time zone: UTC+8 (MSK+5)
- Postal code: 665531
- OKTMO ID: 25650407111

Nevanka (Russian: Неванка) is a village in Chunsky District of Irkutsk Oblast, Russia. It lies on the Chuna River.
