= Ulger (theater) =

Puppet theatre in Ulan-Ude, Buryatia, Russia

State Buryat Republican Puppet Theater «Ulger»
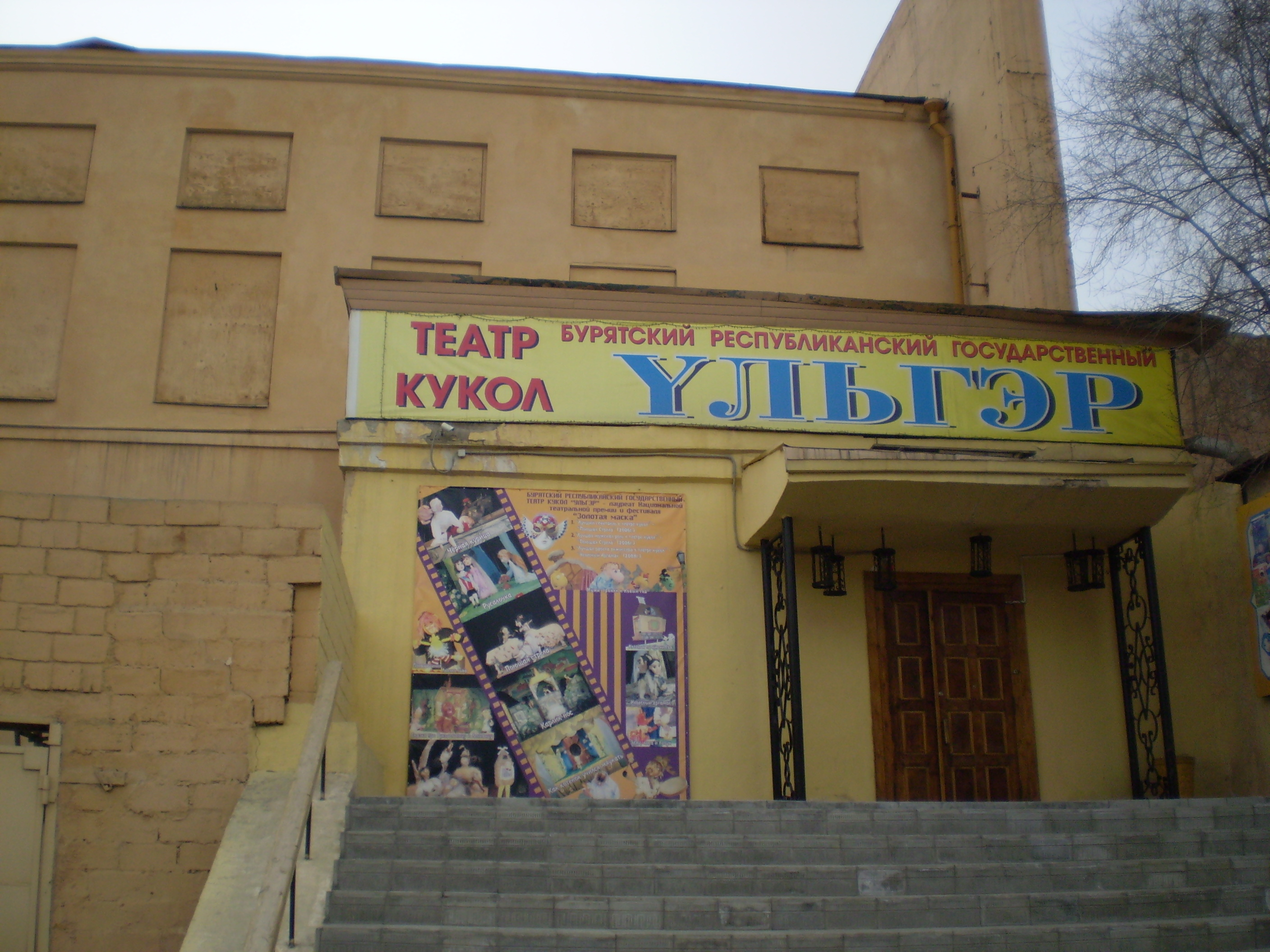
- Interactive map of State Buryat Republican Puppet Theater «Ulger»
- Address: Lenin st. 46; Ulan-Ude; Russia
- Type: Puppet theatre

Construction
- Years active: Since 1967

Ulger (Russian:Ульгэр) theater is a puppet theater in the city of Ulan-Ude, Buryatia, Russia.

It was founded in 1967. Repertoire: classic tales of the world, Russian fairy tales and plays for children written by Buryat playwrights and writers. Performances are in the Russian and Buryat languages.
