= Taseyeva =

Location
- Country: Russia

Physical characteristics
- Mouth: Angara
  - coordinates: 58.0803°N 94.0117°E
- Length: 116 km (72 mi)
- Basin size: 128,000 km^{2} (49,000 sq mi)

Basin features
- Progression: Angara→ Yenisey→ Kara Sea

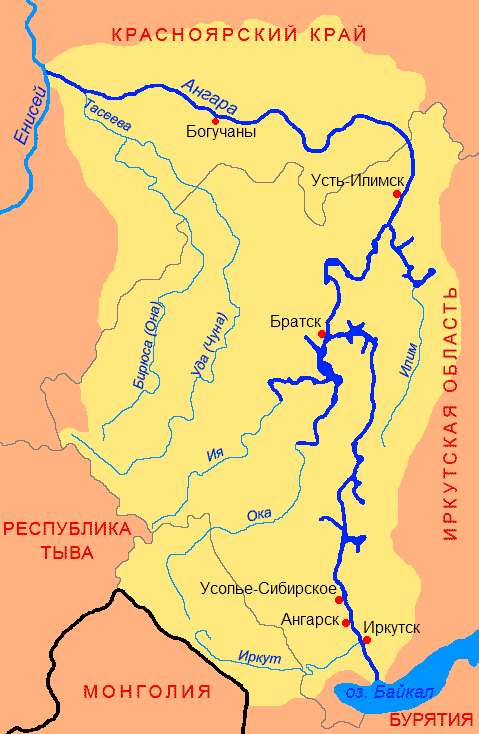
Map of the Angara and the Taseyeva

The Taseyeva (Russian: Тасе́ева, IPA: [tɐˈsʲeɪvə]) is a river in Krasnoyarsk Krai, Russia. It is the largest, left tributary of the Angara and is 116 kilometres (72 mi) long. If its right source river, the Chuna, is included, it is 1,319 km (820 mi) long. Its drainage basin covers 128,000 km^{2} (49,000 mi^{2}). The river is formed by the confluence of the Biryusa and Chuna and flows northwest to its mouth in the Angara, close to Kulakovo. Its average discharge is 740 cubic metres per second (26,000 cu ft/s).

The Taseyeva and its tributaries, the Biryusa and Chuna rivers, drain much of the area between the Angara and the upper Yenisey. The Biryusa (west) and Chuna (east) flow crookedly north, then bear northwest and join to form the Taseyeva. The Taseyeva continues west and then north to join the Angara, which flows west for 68 kilometres (42 mi) to join the Yenisey.
