= Biryusinsk =

Biryusinsk Бирюсинск
- Town
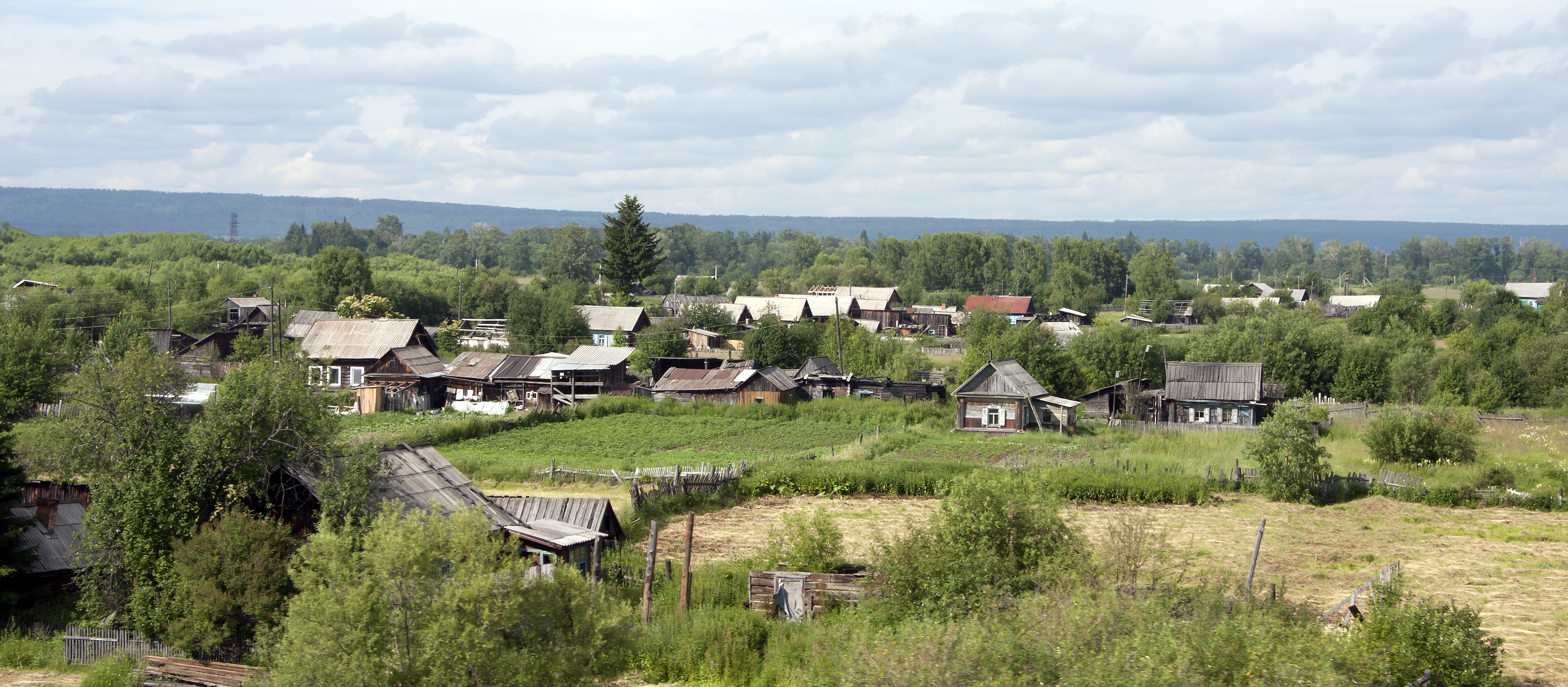
- View of Biryusinsk

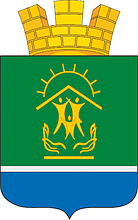
- Flag Coat of arms
- Interactive map of Biryusinsk
- Location of Biryusinsk Biryusinsk (Irkutsk Oblast)
- Coordinates: 55°58′N 97°50′E
- Country: Russia
- Federal subject: Irkutsk Oblast
- Administrative district: Tayshetsky District
- Founded: 1897
- Town status since: 1967
- Elevation: 300 m (980 ft)

Population (2010 Census)
  - Total: 8,981
  - Estimate (2021): 8,632 (−3.9%)

Municipal status
  - Municipal district: Tayshetsky Municipal District
  - Urban settlement: Biryusinskoye Urban Settlement
  - Capital of: Biryusinskoye Urban Settlement
- Time zone: UTC+8 (MSK+5)
- Postal code: 665050–665053
- Dialing code: +7 39563
- OKTMO ID: 25636105001
- Website: www.biryusinsk.ks8.ru

Biryusinsk (Russian: Бирюсинск, IPA: [bʲɪrʲʉˈsʲinsk]) is a town in Tayshetsky District of Irkutsk Oblast, Russia, located on the right bank of the Biryusa River (Angara's basin), 682 kilometers (424 mi) northwest of Irkutsk, the administrative center of the oblast. Population: 8,981 (2010 census); 10,004 (2002 census); 12,066 (1989 Soviet census).

It was previously known as Suyetikha (until 1967).

== History ==
It was founded in 1897 as Suyetikha (Суетиха), named so after the Suyetikha River.. In 1934, it was granted work settlement status. It was granted town status in 1967 and renamed Biryusinsk after the Biryusa River.

== Administrative and municipal status ==
Within the framework of administrative divisions, Biryusinsk is subordinated to Tayshetsky District. As a municipal division, the town of Biryusinsk is incorporated within Tayshetsky Municipal District as Biryusinskoye Urban Settlement.

== Economy ==
Biryusinsk's industrial enterprises include a timber factory and a hydrolysis plant.
