= Ulan-Ude Ethnographic Museum =

Coordinates: 51°53′11″N 107°38′54″E

The Ulan-Ude Ethnographic Museum
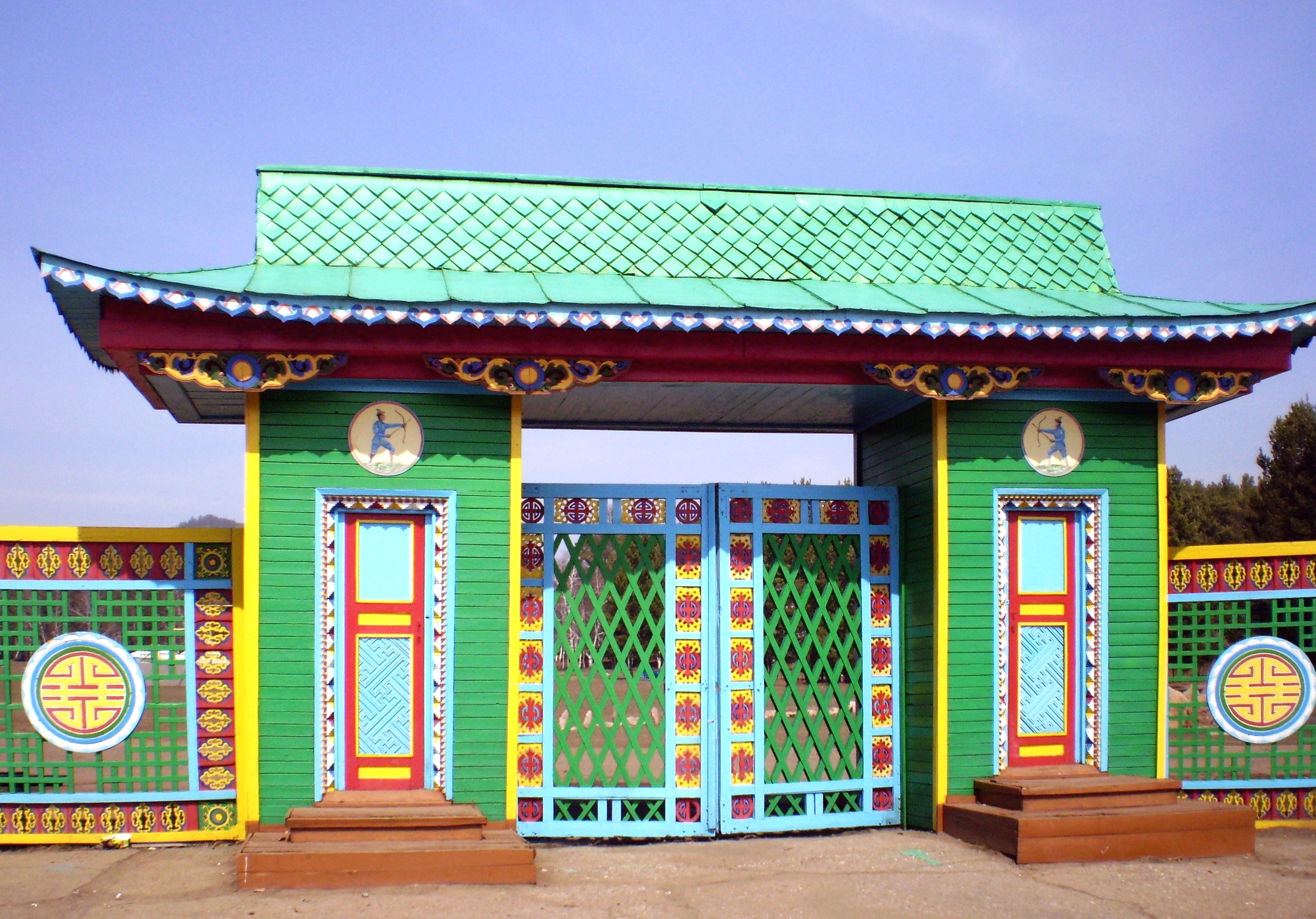
- Gate to the museum
- Established: July 6, 1973
- Location: village Upper Berezovka, eight kilometres northeast of Ulan-Ude, Buryatia, Russia
- Type: Open-air museum
- Collection size: 40 architectural monuments and the museums collection exceeds 11,000 exhibits.

The Ulan-Ude Ethnographic Museum (Russian: Этнографический музей народов Забайкалья, romanized: Etnograficheskiy muzey narodov Zabaykalya, Russian Buryat: Үбэр Байгалай арадуудай угсаатанай зүйн музей, romanized: Über Baygalay araduuday ügsaatanay züyn muzey) is an outdoor museum, located in the village Upper Berezovka, eight kilometres northeast of Ulan-Ude, Buryatia, Russia.

== Overview ==
The museum opened on July 6, 1973, and is one of the largest open air museums in Russia, covering an area of 37 hectares. The museum has collected more than 40 architectural monuments and the museums collection exceeds 11,000 exhibits. One of the first pieces in the museum's collection was Nikolsk Church from the town of Nikolsk.

The territory of the museum is divided into seven complexes; the Archaeological Complex, which consists of a private pavilion and open area, the Evenkijskij complex, the Buryat Complex which consists of the gers (such as wood and felt), and Buddhist construction etc., the Cis-Baikal Complex, which contains a Buryat Cossack house, transferred to the museum in 1975, the Zabaikalsky complex which contains a barn and an old complex with peasant tools and barn.

== Exhibits ==
The Ulan-Ude Ethnographic Museum is one of the largest open air museums in Russia. The museum covers an area of 37 hectares and has more than 40 buildings and more than 11,000 objects. The museum is divided into several complexes

== Archaeological complex ==
The archeological complex consists of a private pavilion and an open area. In the open area there are stone graves, stone pillars, guard stones, etc. The first burial site was discovered in 1896 in the Kyakhtinsky area. In the Middle Ages, graves were flat round stones. The private pavilion has objects from the Lower Ivolginsk settlement.

== Evenkiyskiy Complex ==
The Evenkiyskiy Complex has tents, a barn and Evenki everyday objects.

== Buryat Complex ==
The Buryat Complex has gers (wood and animal skin) and a Buddhist temple (Dugan).

In the first half of the 19th century, Buryat temples had many domed roofs. In the second half of the 19th century, a new type of temple appeared which was substantially different from earlier temples. An example is Dugan "Devadzhin" which was taken from Gusinoozyorsk Datsan. In 1926 the temple was rebuilt - the outer appearance of the temple did not change but the area around the temple increased. The temple was predominantly painted yellow because yellow is sacred in Tibetan Buddhism. Inside the temple is a "Tunshi" panel showing an Indian story about four animals arguing about how to get fruit from a tall tree.

== Baikal Complex ==
Tha Baikal Complex has a winter house of a wealthy Buryat Cossack SB Safronov. The winter house was built in Horety (now Nukutsky district of the Irkutsk region). It was transferred to the museum in 1975.
