= Heinrich Werner (linguist) =

German-Russian linguist (born 1936)

Heinrich Werner (born December 2, 1936 in Krasnyj Jar, Volga German Autonomous Soviet Socialist Republic) is a Russian linguist of Volga German origin. He is also referred to as Genrih Kasparovič Verner.

== Life ==
As a result of the forced deportation of the Volga Germans in 1941, Heinrich Werner spent his childhood from the age of six in the village of Grosskossul in the Krasnoyarsk Krai. After completing secondary school (Abitur) and military service, he studied from 1958 at the Pedagogical Institute in Tomsk and received his doctorate there in 1966 in Germanic philology and general linguistics.

He subsequently headed the Department of German in Omsk and, from 1969, in Taganrog. In 1975, he completed his habilitation at the Academy of Sciences in Leningrad with a dissertation on the accent system of the Ket.

In 1991 he emigrated to Germany. In 1992 he was elected a foreign member of the Russian Academy of Sciences and became a research associate at the University of Bonn. From 2005 to 2010 he worked at the Max Planck Institute for Evolutionary Anthropology in Leipzig.

Werner's research focuses primarily on the Yeniseian languages and German dialectology. He authored numerous monographs on the history, culture, and languages of the Yeniseian peoples, whose descent from the Dingling he considers possible.

== Works (selection) ==
- Das Klassensystem in den Jenissej-Sprachen. Harrassowitz, Wiesbaden 1994, ISBN 3-447-03598-6.
- Zur Typologie der Jenissej-Sprachen. Harrassowitz, Wiesbaden 1995, ISBN 3-447-03741-5.
- Vergleichende Akzentologie der Jenissej-Sprachen. Harrassowitz, Wiesbaden 1996, ISBN 3-447-03845-4.
- Die ketische Sprache. Harrassowitz, Wiesbaden 1997, ISBN 3-447-03908-6.
- Das Jugische (Sym-Ketische). Harrassowitz, Wiesbaden 1997, ISBN 3-447-03999-X.
- Abriß der kottischen Grammatik. Harrassowitz, Wiesbaden 1997, ISBN 3-447-03971-X.
- M.A. Castrén und die Jenissejistik. Die Jenissej-Sprachen des 19. Jahrhunderts. Harrassowitz, Wiesbaden 2003, ISBN 3-447-04725-9.
- Die Diathese in den Jenissej-Sprachen aus typologischer Sicht. Harrassowitz, Wiesbaden 2004, ISBN 3-447-05122-1.
- Zur jenissejisch-indianischen Urverwandtschaft. Harrassowitz, Wiesbaden 2004, ISBN 978-3-447-04896-5.
- Die Jenissej-Sprachen des 18. Jahrhunderts. Harrassowitz, Wiesbaden 2005, ISBN 978-3-447-05239-9.
- Die Welt der Jenissejer im Lichte des Wortschatzes. Zur Rekonstruktion der jenissejischen Protokultur. Harrassowitz, Wiesbaden 2006, ISBN 978-3-447-05431-7.
- Die Glaubensvorstellungen der Jenissejer aus der Sicht des Tengrismus. Harrassowitz, Wiesbaden 2007, ISBN 978-3-447-05611-3.
- Wolgadeutsche Mundarten: Die Mundart von Krasnojar (Zeitschrift für Dialektologie und Linguistik – Beihefte, Band 190). Franz Steiner, Stuttgart 2022, ISBN 978-3-515-13302-9.
