= Chuna (river) =

River in Russia

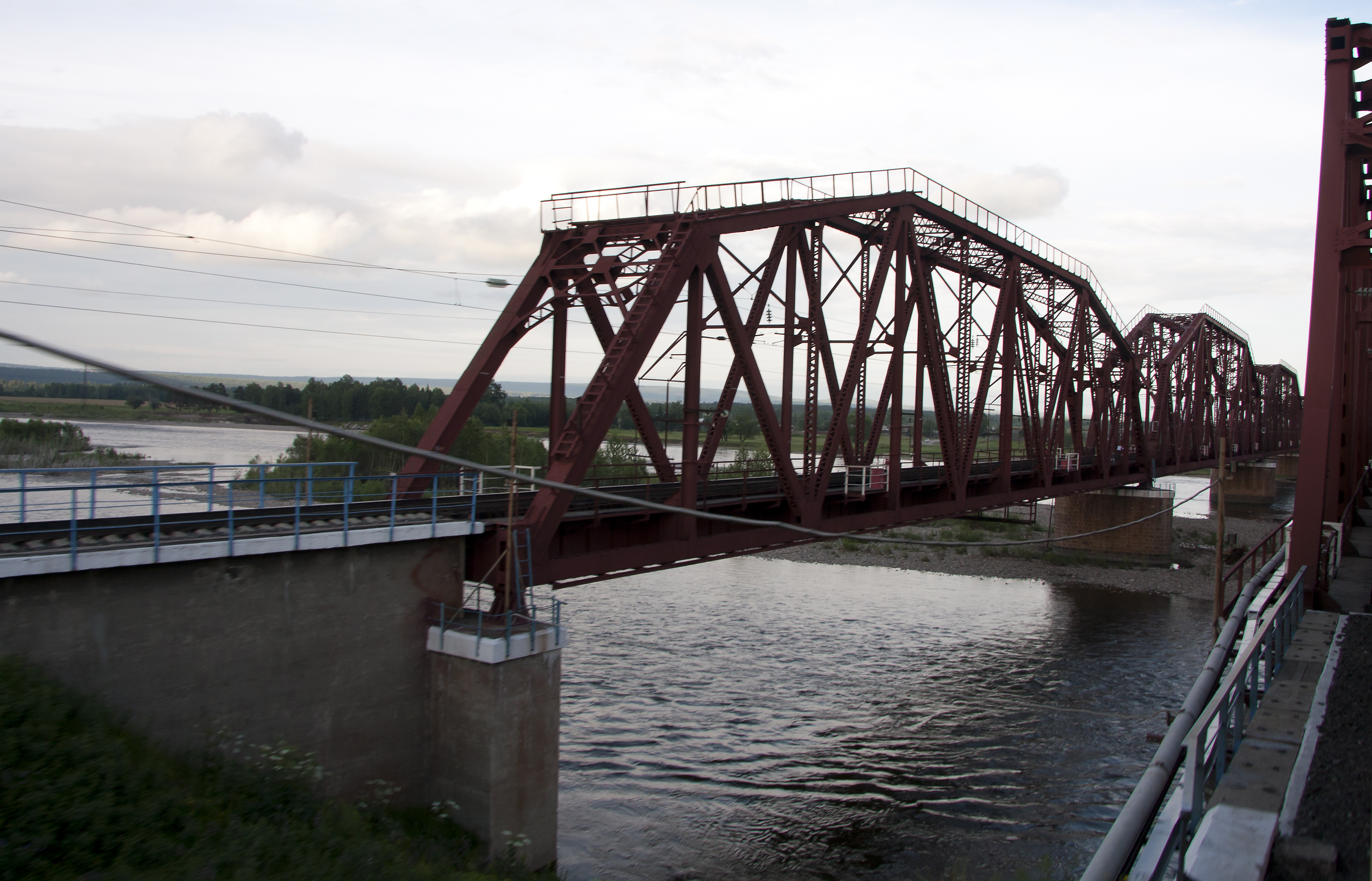
- The Trans-Siberian Railway crossing the Chuna near Nizhneudinsk.

Location
- Country: Russia

Physical characteristics
- Mouth: Taseyeva
  - coordinates: 57.7214°N 95.4211°E
- Length: 1,203 km (748 mi)
- Basin size: 56,800 km^{2} (21,900 sq mi)

Basin features
- Progression: Taseyeva→ Angara→ Yenisey→ Kara Sea

The Chuna (Russian: Чуна), called Uda (Уда; Mongolian: Үд, Üd) above the settlement of Chunsky, is a river in Irkutsk Oblast and Krasnoyarsk Krai of Russia. It is 1,203 kilometers (748 mi) long, with a drainage basin of 56,800 square kilometers (21,900 sq mi).

The river has its sources in the southwestern parts of Irkutsk Oblast, on the northern slopes of the eastern Sayan Mountains. It then flows over the Central Siberian Plateau, and passes the Nevanka and Nizhneudinsk. Logs are floated downriver and loaded onto the Baikal–Amur Mainline at Chunsky (station name Sosnovye Rodniki). It then turns west, and joins the Biryusa to form the Taseyeva, a tributary of the Angara.
