= Biryusa =

River in Irkutsk Oblast and Krasnoyarsk Krai, Russia

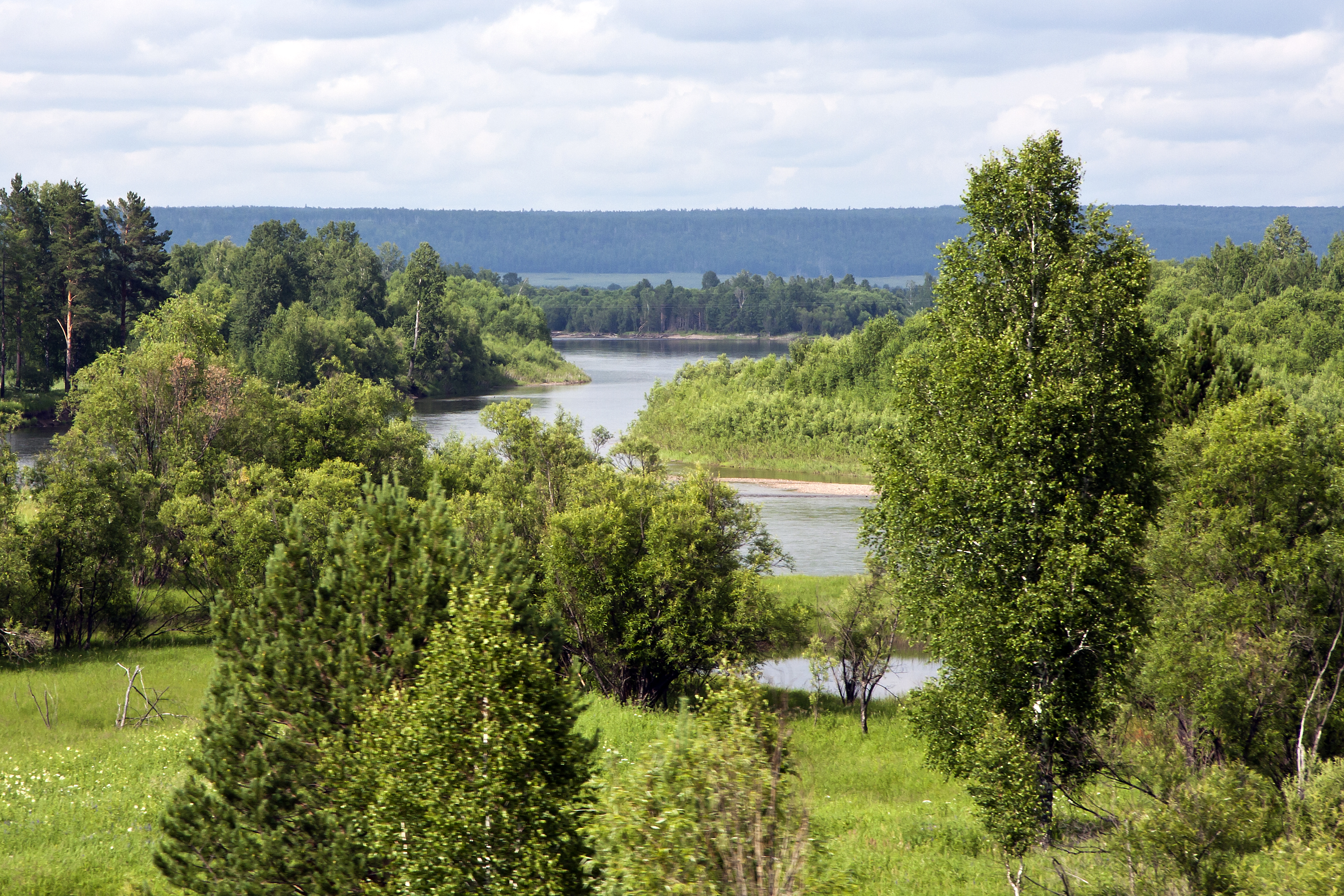

Location
- Country: Russia

Physical characteristics
- Mouth: Taseyeva
  - coordinates: 57°43′17″N 95°25′16″E
- Length: 1,012 km (629 mi)
- Basin size: 55,800 km^{2} (21,500 sq mi)

Basin features
- Progression: Taseyeva→ Angara→ Yenisey→ Kara Sea

The Biryusa (Russian: Бирюса, in its lower reaches also called the Ona) is a river in Irkutsk Oblast and Krasnoyarsk Krai, Russia. The Biryusa is 1,012 kilometres (629 mi) long, with a drainage basin of 55,800 square kilometres (21,500 mi^{2}).

The river has its sources in the far southwestern areas of Irkutsk Oblast, at an elevation of 2,500 metres (8,200 ft), on the northern slopes of the Sayan Mountains. From the source area the river flows north over the Central Siberian Plateau. It is crossed by the Trans-Siberian Railway at Biryusinsk, which is a few kilometers west of Tayshet where the Baikal Amur Mainline starts. The Biryusa then turns northwest, and finally flows together with the Chuna and forms the Taseyeva (a tributary to the Angara).

In Russian folklore it is the subject of several songs, for example, "Biryusinka."
