= Yugh =

Yugh may refer to:

- Yugh people
- Yugh language
