= Tungusic peoples =

Ethnolinguistic group

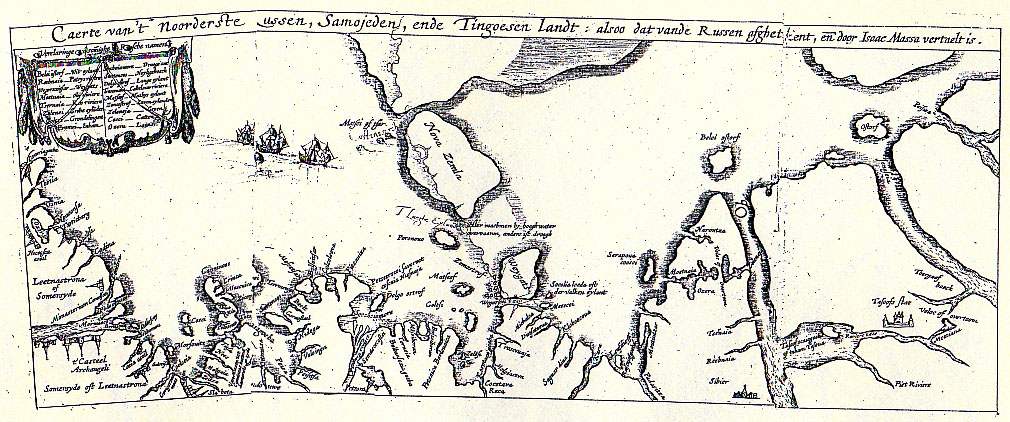
- 1612 map by Isaac Massa showing Tingoesen landt (land of the Tungus, i.e. Evenks)

Total population
- Approx. 11 million

Regions with significant populations
- China: 10,646,954
- Russia: 78,051
- Taiwan: 12,000
- Japan: 1,020
- Ukraine: 610
- Mongolia: 537
- United States: 200

Languages
- Tungusic languages, Russian (in Russia), Mandarin Chinese (in the China)

Tungusic peoples are an ethnolinguistic group formed by the speakers of Tungusic languages (or Manchu–Tungus languages). They are native to Siberia and China. Manchus are by far the most populous Tungusic ethnic group.

The Tungusic language family is divided into two main branches, Northern (Ewenic–Udegheic) and Southern Tungusic (Jurchenic–Nanaic).

== Name ==
The name Tungusic is artificial, and properly refers just to the linguistic family (Tungusic languages). It is derived from Russian Tungus (Тунгус), a Russian exonym for the Evenks (Ewenki). English usage of Tungusic was introduced by Friedrich Max Müller in the 1850s, based on earlier use of German Tungusik by Heinrich Julius Klaproth. The alternative term Manchu–Tungus is also in use (Тунгусо-маньчжурские 'Tunguso-Manchurian'). The name Tunguska, a region of eastern Siberia bounded on the west by the Tunguska Rivers and on the east by the Pacific Ocean, has its origin from the Tungus people (Evenks).

Russian Tungus was taken from East Turkic tunguz (literally 'boar', from Old Turkic toŋuz). It was once believed that the word Tungus was connected to the Chinese word Donghu (東胡, Eastern Hu). This "chance similarity in modern pronunciation led to the once widely held assumption that the Eastern Hu were Tungusic in language. However, there is little basis for this theory."

== History ==
It is generally suggested that the homeland of the Tungusic people is in northeastern Manchuria, somewhere near the Amur River region. Genetic evidence collected from the Ulchsky District suggests a date for the expansion predating 3500 BC.

The Tungusic expansion into Siberia displaced the indigenous Siberian languages, which are now grouped under the term Paleosiberian.

Tungusic people on the Amur River like Udeghe, Ulchi, and Nanai adopted Chinese influences in their religion and clothing with Chinese dragons on ceremonial robes, scroll and spiral bird, and monster mask designs, Chinese New Year, using silk and cotton, iron cooking pots, and heated homes from China.

The Manchus originally came from Manchuria, which is now Northeast China and the Russian Far East. Following the Manchu establishment of the Qing dynasty in the 17th century, they have been almost completely assimilated into the culture of the ethnic Han population of China, adopting their language.

The southern Tungusic Manchu farming sedentary lifestyle was very different from the nomadic hunter gatherer forager lifestyle of their more northern Tungusic relatives like the Warka, which left the Qing state to attempt to make them sedentarize and farm like Manchus.

During the 17th century, the Tsardom of Russia was expanding east across Siberia, and into Tungusic-speaking lands, resulting in early border skirmishes with the Qing dynasty of China, leading up to the 1689 Treaty of Nerchinsk. The first published description of a Tungusic people to reach beyond Russia into the rest of Europe was by the Dutch traveler Isaac Massa in 1612. He passed along information from Russian reports after his stay in Moscow.

== Ethnic groups ==
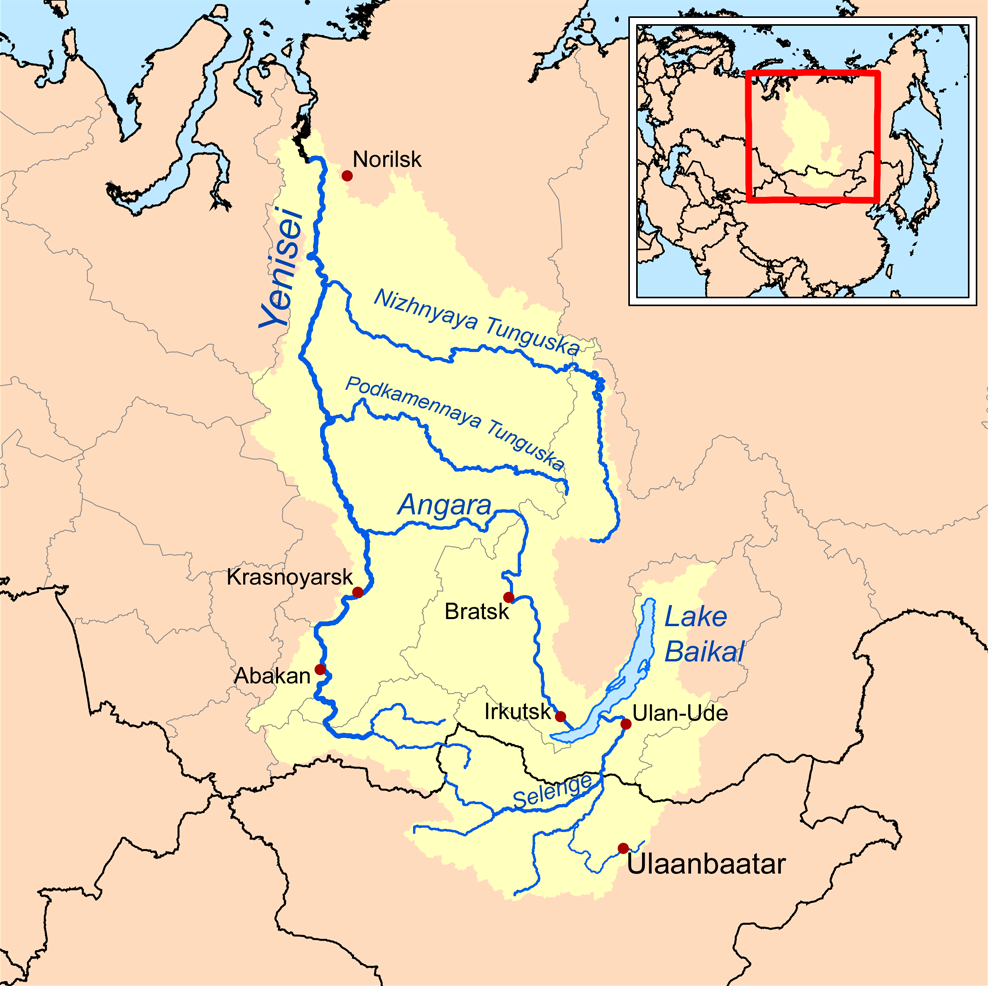
Tunguska rivers, forming the western boundary

"Tungusic" (Manchu-Tungus) peoples are divided into two main branches: northern and southern.

The southern branch is dominated by the Manchus (historically Jurchens). Qing emperors were Manchu, and the Manchu group has largely been sinicized (the Manchu language being moribund, with 20 native speakers reported as of 2007).

The Sibe were possibly a Tungusic-speaking section of the (Mongolic) Shiwei and have been conquered by the expanding Manchu (Jurchen). Their language is mutually intelligible with Manchu. The Nanai (Goldi) are also derived from the Jurchen. The Orok (Ulta) are an offshoot of the Nanai. Other minor groups closely related to the Nanai are the Ulch, Oroch, and Udege. The Udege live in the Primorsky Krai and Khabarovsk Krai in the Russian Federation.

The northern branch is mostly formed by the closely related ethnic groups of Evenks (Ewenki) and Evens. (Evenks and Evens are also grouped as "Evenic". Their ethnonyms are only distinguished by a different suffix - -n for Even and -nkī for Evenkī; endonymically, they even use the same adjective for themselves - ǝwǝdī, meaning "Even" in the Even language and "Evenkī" in the Evenkī language.) The Evenks live in the Evenk Autonomous Okrug of Russia in addition to many parts of eastern Siberia, especially Sakha Republic. The Evens are very closely related to the Evenks by language and culture, and they likewise inhabit various parts of eastern Siberia. People who classify themselves as Evenks in the Russian census tend to live toward the west and toward the south of eastern Siberia, whereas people who classify themselves as Evens tend to live toward the east and toward the north of eastern Siberia, with some degree of overlap in the middle (notably, in certain parts of Sakha Republic). Minor ethnic groups also in the northern branch are the Negidals and the Oroqen. The Oroqen, Solon, and Khamnigan inhabit some parts of Heilongjiang Province, Inner Mongolia in China, and Mongolia and may be considered as subgroups of the Evenk ethnicity, though the Solons and the Khamnigans in particular have interacted closely with Mongolic peoples (Mongol, Daur, Buryat), and they are ethnographically quite distinct from the Evenks in Russia.

The Taz people are unique among Tungusic peoples for having a Sinitic dialect as their native language. They are the result of intermarriages between Han Chinese men and Udege, Nanai, and Oroch women in Outer Manchuria during the Qing dynasty.

== Demographics ==
Distribution of the Tungusic languages

Tungusic peoples are:

List of the modern Tungusic peoples
Ethnonym	Population	Main country
Manchus	10,424,785	China
Sibes	190,481	China
Evenks	69,503	Russia
Evens	22,487	Russia
Nanais	17,514	Russia
Oroqens	8,659	China
Ulchs	2,841	Russia
Udeges	1,538	Russia
Orochs	815	Russia
Negidals	565	Russia
Oroks	315	Russia
Taz	274	Russia

== Population genomics ==
Tungusic, Sinitic, and Mongolic peoples all have large amounts of Ancient Northeast Asian ancestry. However, Tungusic populations are predominantly of Neolithic Amur River Basin-related descent, with modern Northern Tungusic populations receiving more input from ancient Xiongnu and Mongols. To a lesser extent, they also received Yellow River and West Eurasian inputs.

Previous studies argued for a potential shared ancestry between Tungusic, Mongolic, Turkic, Koreanic, and Japonic populations via Neolithic agriculturalist societies from Northeast China (e.g. the Liao civilization) as a part of the hypothetical Altaic language family. However, genetic data contradicts this because while West Liao River ancestry was found among the "macro-Altaic" Koreans and Japanese, it was absent among the "micro-Altaic" Tungusic and Mongolic populations. Other complications of associating the hypothetical Altaic language family to the West Liao River is that the earliest genomes from the West Liao River also contain Yellow River ancestry (which is not found in Amur or Primorye) and that the similarities between Ancient Northeast Asian ancestries originating from the West Liao River with those native to the Amur region make such movements into this region difficult to track genetically.

The Manchus, the largest Tungusic-speaking population, displays increased genetic affinity with Han Chinese, and Koreans, compared to with other Tungusic peoples. The Manchu were therefore an exception to the coherent genetic structure of Tungusic-speaking populations, likely due to the large-scale population migrations and genetic admixtures with the Han Chinese in the past few hundred years. Certain Tungusic groups like Even, Evenki, Hezhen, Oroqen and Xibo are also distinguished from other Tungusic groups by having small amounts of West Eurasian ancestry.

=== Paternal haplogroups ===
Tungusic peoples display primarily paternal haplogroups associated with Ancient Northeast Asians, and display high affinity to Mongolic peoples as well as other Northeastern Asian populations. Their primarily haplogroup is associated with the C-M217 clade and its subclades. The other dominant haplogroup is Haplogroup N-M231, which was found in Neolithic Northeastern Asian societies along the Liao River and widespread throughout Siberia. An exception are modern Manchu people which display higher frequency of Haplogroup O-M122. 29/97 = 29.9% C-M86 in a sample of Mongols from northwest Mongolia,

			Haplogroups (values in percent)																	
Population	Language	n	C	C-M217	C-M48	C-M86/M77	C-M407	O	O-M122	O-M119	O-M268	O-M176	N	N-Tat	N-P43	R1a	R1b	Q	Others	Reference
Evenks (China)	Northern Tungusic	41	43.9	43.9	-	34.1	-	36.6	24.4	2.4	9.8	2.4	4.9	0.0	2.4	4.9	0.0	9.8	0.0	Hammer 2006
Evenks (China)	Northern Tungusic	26	57.7	57.7	30.8	-	0.0	34.6	23.1	7.7	3.8	0.0	3.8	-	-	0.0	0.0	0.0	K-M9(xNO-M214, P-92R7)=3.8	Xue 2006
Evenks (Russia)	Northern Tungusic	95	68.4	68.4	-	54.7	-	0.0	0.0	0.0	0.0	0.0	18.9	16.8	2.1	1.1	0.0	4.2	I1-P30=5.3; J2-M172(xM12)=2.1	Hammer 2006
Evens (Russia)	Northern Tungusic	31	74.2	74.2	-	61.3	-	0.0	0.0	0.0	0.0	0.0	12.9	12.9	0.0	6.5	0.0	3.2	I2a1-P37.2=3.2	Hammer 2006
Hezhe (China)	Amur Tungusic	45	28.9	22.2	11.1	-	-	51.1	44.4	0.0	6.7	4.4	20.0	-	17.8	0.0	0.0	0.0	0.0	Xue 2006
Manchu (China)	Jurchen-Manchu	52	26.9	26.9	-	0.0	-	57.7	38.5	3.8	9.6	3.8	5.8	0.0	0.0	1.9	-	0.0	R2a-M124=3.8; R1-M173(xP25, M73, M269, SRY10831b)=1.9; J-12f2(xM172)=1.9	Hammer 2006
Manchu (China)	Jurchen-Manchu	35	25.7	25.7	2.9	-	-	54.3	37.1	2.9	14.3	5.7	14.3	0.0	2.9	0.0	0.0	0.0	DE-YAP(xE-SRY4064)=2.9; K-M9(xNO-M214, P-92R7)=2.9	Xue 2006
Oroqen (China)	Northern Tungusic	22	90.9	90.9	-	68.2	-	4.5	0.0	0.0	4.5	0.0	4.5	4.5	0.0	0.0	0.0	0.0	0.0	Hammer 2006
Oroqen (China)	Northern Tungusic	31	61.3	61.3	41.9	-	-	29.0	19.4	0.0	6.5	0.0	6.5	0.0	6.5	0.0	0.0	0.0	K-M9(xNO-M214, P-92R7)=3.2	Xue 2006
Ulchi (Russia)	Amur Tungusic	52	69.2	69.2	34.6	26.9	0.0	15.4	11.5	1.9	1.9	-	5.8	3.8	0.0	0.0	0.0	5.8	I-P37=1.9% J1-M267(xP58)=1.9%	Balanovska 2018
Xibe (China)	Jurchen-Manchu	41	26.8	26.8	4.9	-	-	36.6	26.8	7.3	2.4	2.4	17.1	4.9	0.0	0.0	-	-	J-12f2=7.3; P-92R7(xR1a-SRY_{10831.2})=2.4; DE-YAP(xE-_{SRY4064})=2.4; BT-SRY_{10831.1}(xC-M130, DE-YAP, J-12f2, K-M9)=2.4	Xue 2006

=== Maternal haplogroups ===
The maternal haplogroups of Tungusic peoples are primarily shared with other Northern East Asians. Maternal haplogroup diversity seems to reflect some amount of gene flow with peoples living around the Sea of Okhotsk (Koryaks, Nivkhs, Ainus, etc.) on one hand and peoples living in East Asia (Mongolic peoples) on the other.

According to a total of 29 sample from the mtDNA studies of Xibo, Oroqen, and Hezhen from China:

Haplogroup	Pop.	%	Notes
Haplogroup B	2/29	6.89%	
Haplogroup C	8/29	27.58%	
Haplogroup D	6/29	20.68%	
Haplogroup F	4/29	13.79%	
Haplogroup M	1/29	3.44%	
Haplogroup R	1/29	3.44%	
Haplogroup J	1/29	3.44%	Found 1 in 10 (10%) samples of Oroqen
Haplogroup U	1/29	3.44%	Found 1 in 9 (11.11%) samples of Xibo
Haplogroup Y	4/29	13.79%	All 4 samples found only in the Hezhen people
Haplogroup Z	1/29	3.44%%	

283 samples from a mtDNA study of Tungusic Evenks, Evens, and Udeges in Russia published in 2013, their main mtDNA haplogroups are :

Haplogroup	Pop.	%	Notes
Haplogroup C	121/283	42.76%	
C4b	55/283	19.43%	
C4a	54/283	19.08%	
C5	11/283	3.89%	
Haplogroup D	69/283	24.38%	
D4l2	18/283	6.36%	
D5a2a2	12/283	4.24%	
D4e4a	10/283	3.53%	
D3	8/283	2.83%	
D4o2	8/283	2.83%	(observed only in the sample of Evens from Kamchatka)
D4i2	5/283	1.77%	
D4j	5/283	1.77%	
D4m2	3/283	1.06%	
Haplogroup Z1a	25/283	8.83%	
Z1a(xZ1a1, Z1a2)	12/283	4.24%	
Z1a2	9/283	3.18%	
Z1a1	4/283	1.41%	
Haplogroup A	11/283	3.89%	
A4(xA2a, A2b1, A8, A12a)	7/283	2.47%	
A12a	2/283	0.71%	
A2a	2/283	0.71%	
Haplogroup N9b	10/283	3.53%	(observed only in the sample of Udege)
Haplogroup G	10/283	3.53%	
G1b	9/283	3.18%	
G2a1	1/283	0.35%	
Haplogroup Y1a	8/283	2.83%	
Haplogroup M7	8/283	2.83%	
M7a2a	6/283	2.12%	
M7c1d	2/283	0.71%	
Haplogroup F1b1	6/283	2.12%	

== Gallery ==
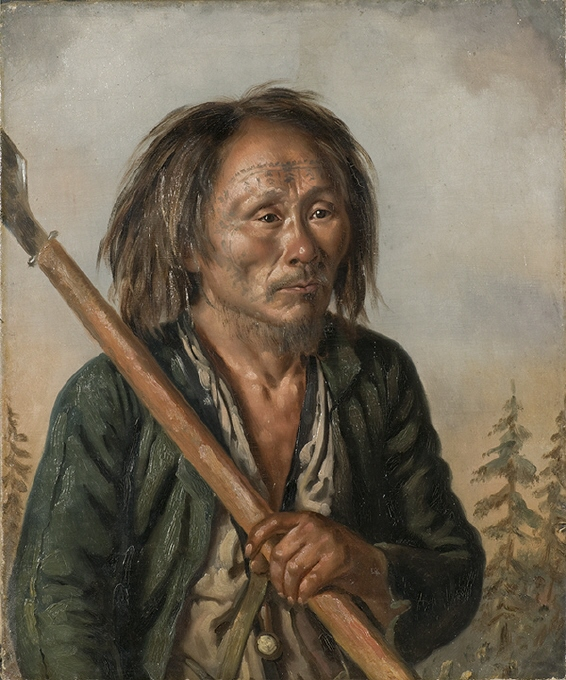
Portrait of a Tungusic man by Carl Peter Mazer (1850)

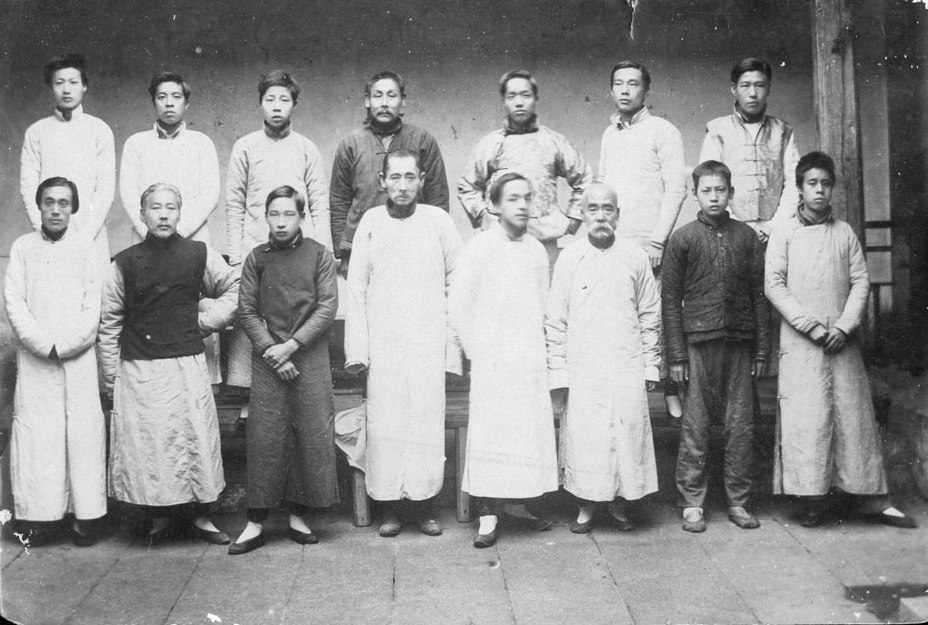
The Manchu people in Fuzhou in 1915

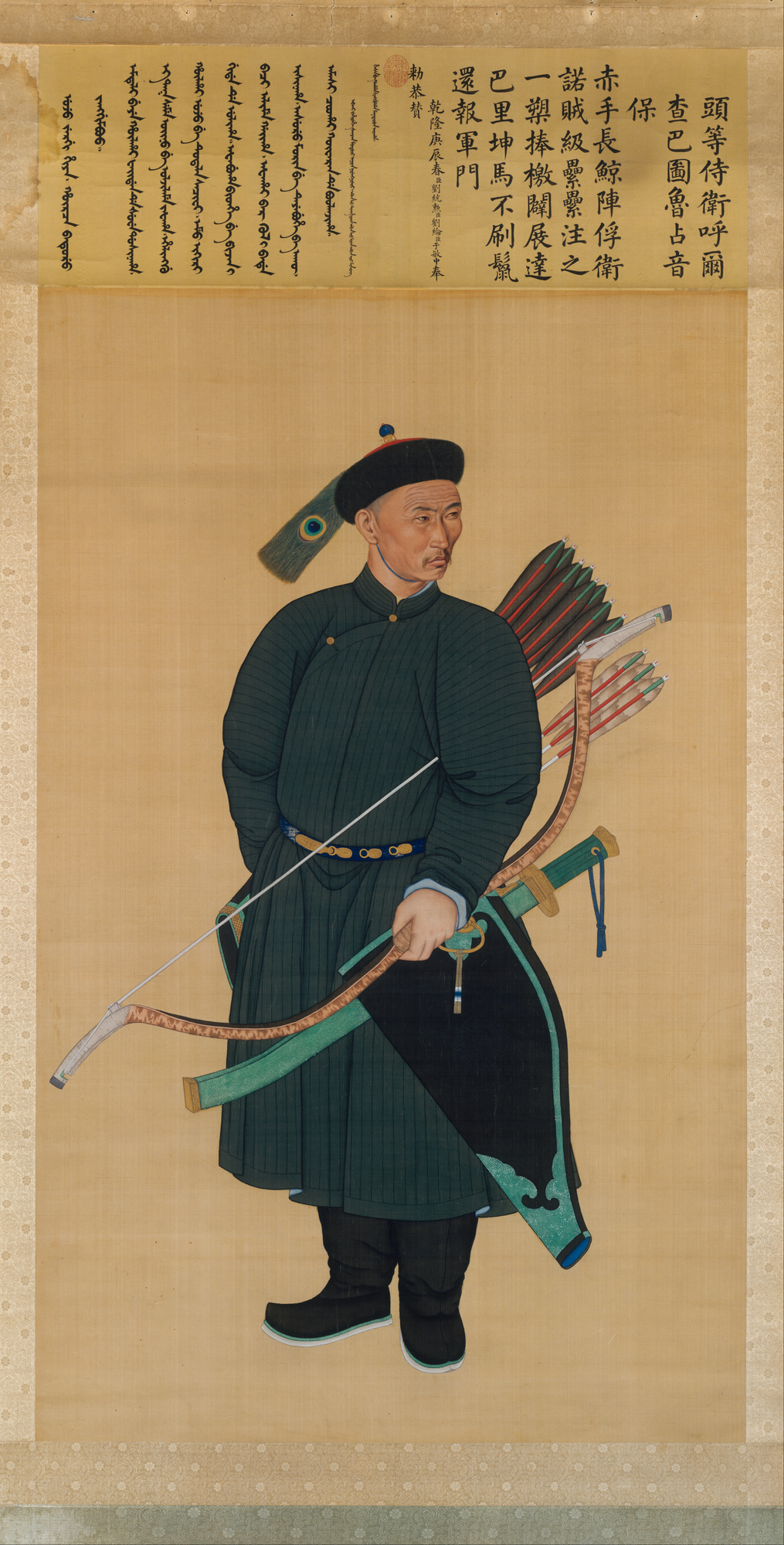
A Manchu guard

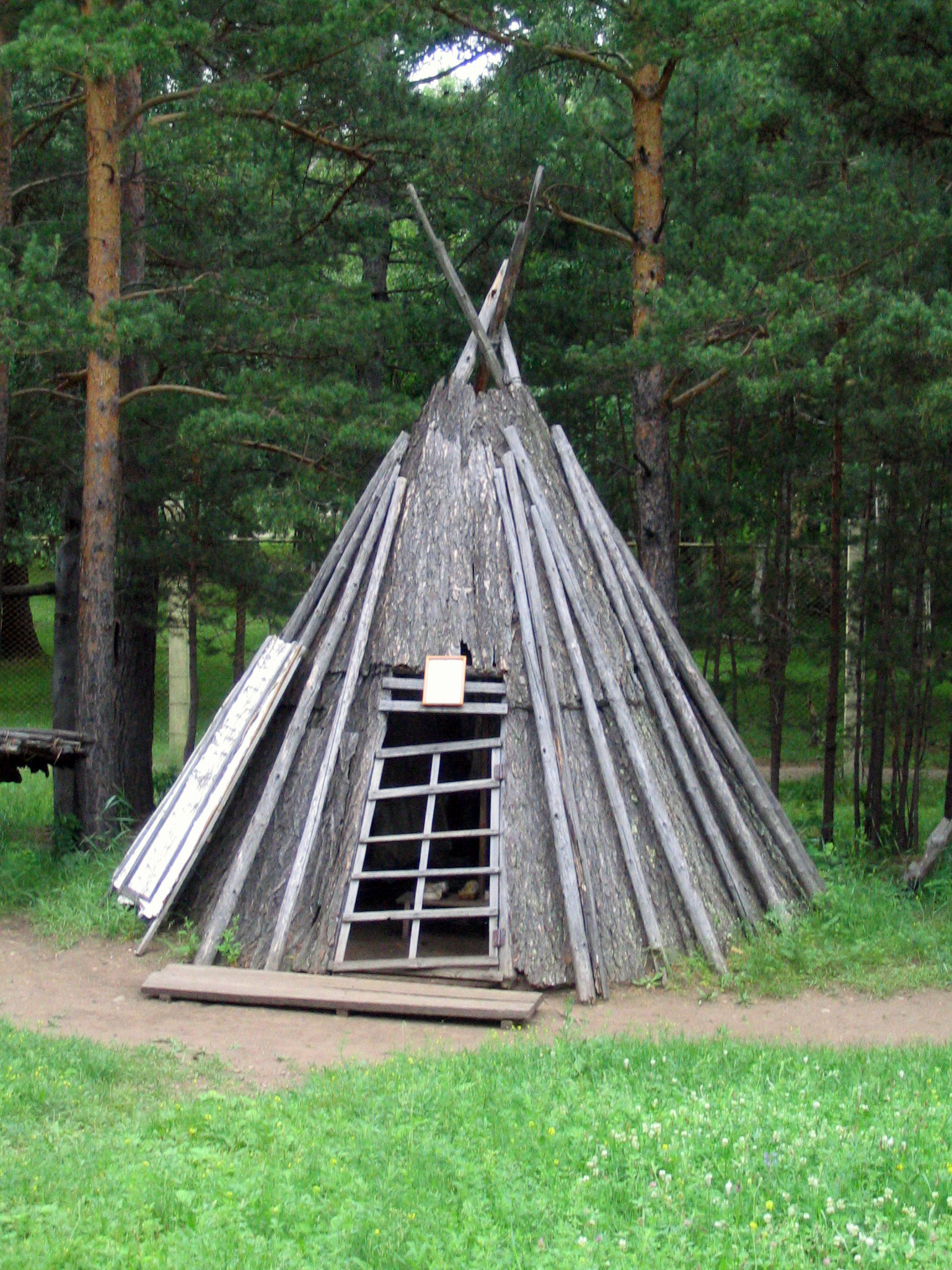
An Evenki wooden home

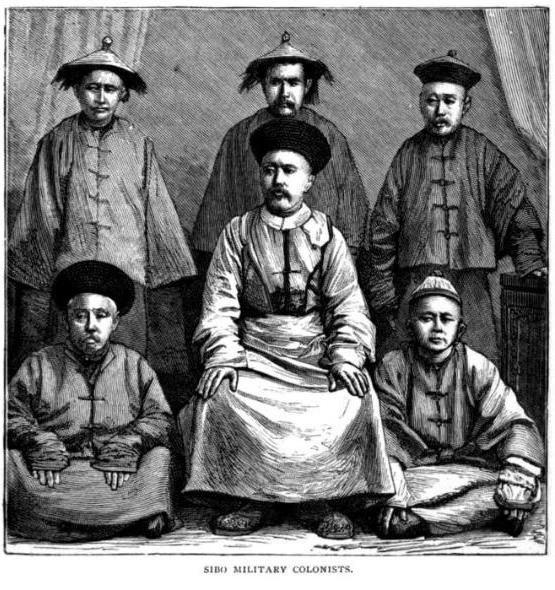
Sibe military colonists (1885)

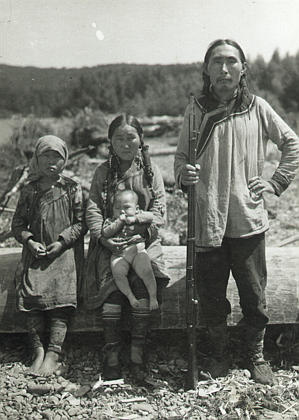
An Udege family (early 20th century)

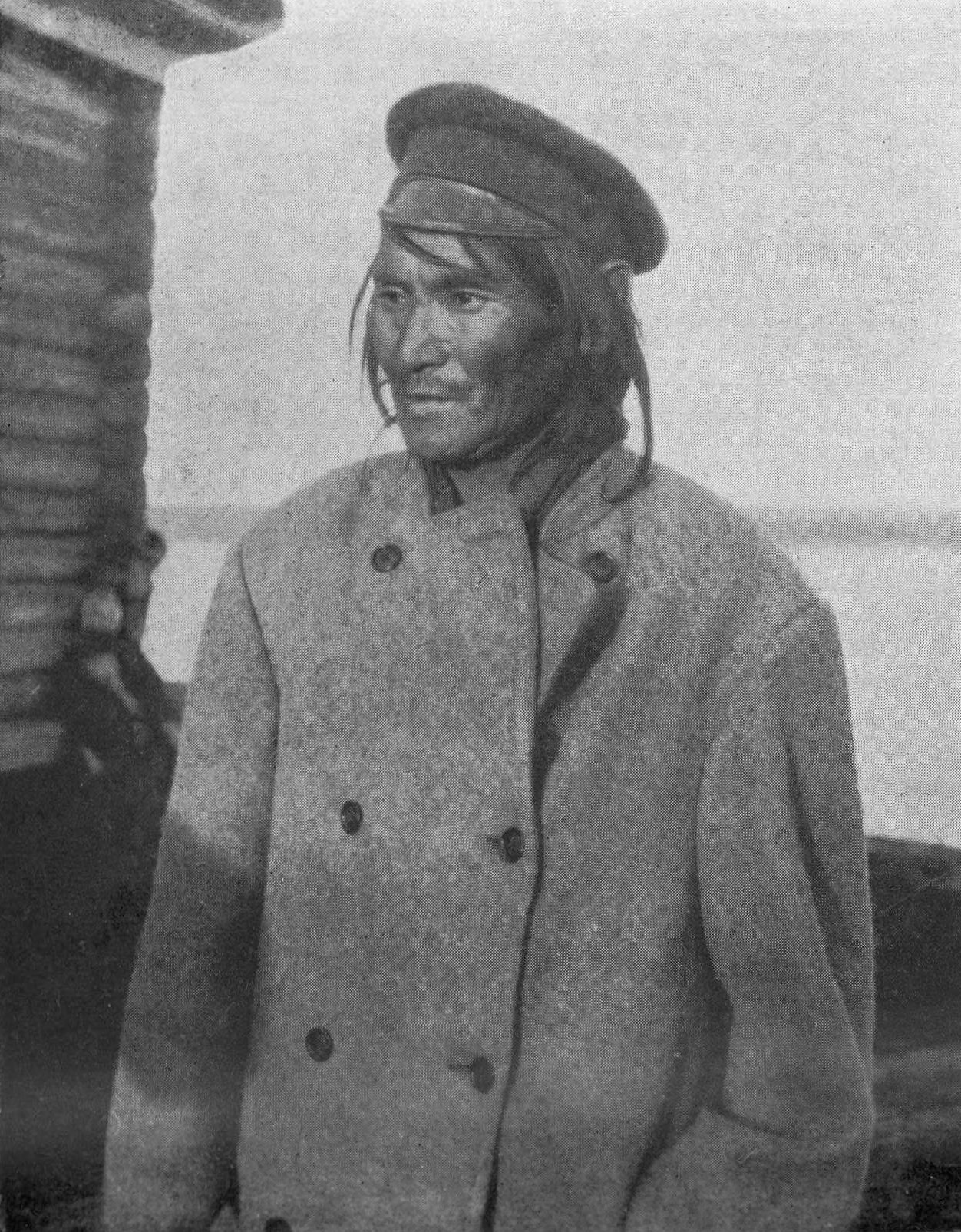
Tungus man in Vorogovo, Siberia (1914)

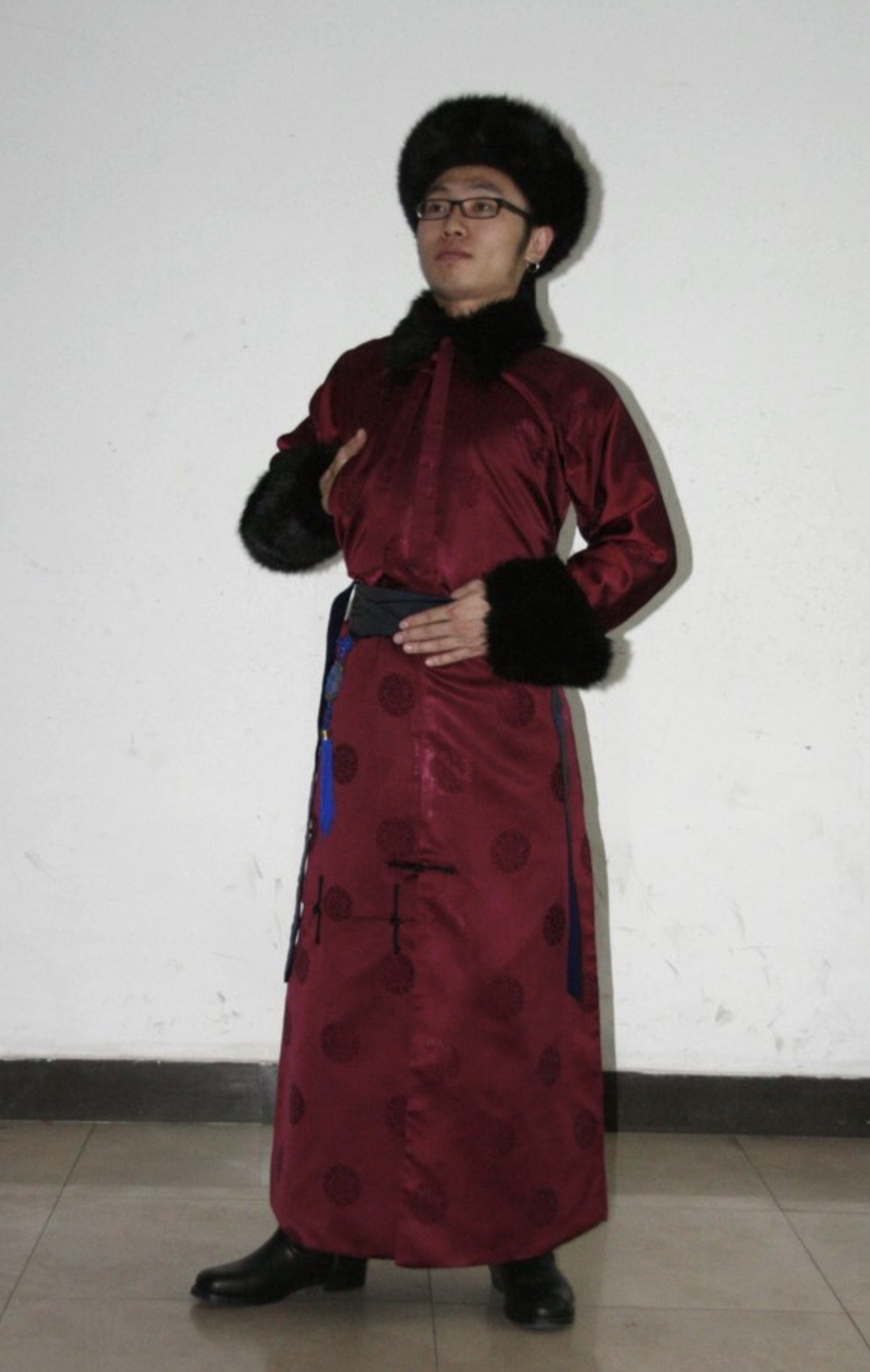
A Manchu man in traditional clothing

== See also ==
- Eskeri
- Xeglun
- Sinicization of the Manchus
- Genocide of indigenous people of Siberia
