= Love my China =

Chinese patriotic song

Love my China (simplified Chinese: 爱我中华; traditional Chinese: 愛我中華) is a Chinese patriotic song.

In 1991, lyricist Qiao Yu and composer Xu Peidong created the song for 4th Minor Ethnic's Games. Ren Si described, "this grand event, where brothers from all ethnic groups across the country gather to participate in sports competitions and performances, was highly valued by the organizing committee. For this purpose, a national call for a theme song was made, but the songs collected were not satisfactory." Therefore, the organizing committee found writer and poet Qiao. Qiao lived in Tibet for seven months and also lived with Hezhe and Elunchun people.

The song adopts the melodies from the music traditions of ethnic minorities in China including Guangxi and Yunnan. According to the scholar Yi Kai, the piece expresses deep patriotism through alternating between moments of intensity and release.

== See also ==
- Music of China
- Propaganda of China
- Chinese nationalism
