= Yugh people =

Yugh
Дьук; kʌnaskɛt; kʌnɟɛŋ

Total population
- 7 (2020)

Regions with significant populations
- Krasnoyarsk Krai (Russia)
- Russia: 7

Languages
- Yugh, Russian

Religion
- Russian Orthodoxy, Animism, Shamanism

Related ethnic groups
- Kets

The Yugh people (pronounced [ɟuk]; often written Yug) are a Yeniseian people, an indigenous group who originally lived throughout central Siberia. The Yugh people live along the Yenisei River from Yeniseisk to the mouth of the Dupches River. The Yughs speak the Yugh language, which is believed to be extinct.

== Recent history ==
Previously the Yughs were considered part of the northern group of Ket people, but in the 1960s the Yugh were distinguished from the Ket, having their own distinct, although related, Yugh language and customs. By the late 1980s the Yugh people, along with their language, had effectively disappeared as a separate ethnic group. By the early 1990s the Yugh language was considered extinct, as only two or three non-fluent Yugh language speakers remained. The Yugh people, along with their relatives the Ket and other extinct branches are referred to as Yeniseians by linguists and ethnographers.

In 1991, the ethnic population consisted of 10 to 15 individuals in the Turukhansky District of the Krasnoyarsk Krai at the Vorogovo settlement.

The 2002 Census recorded 19 ethnic Yugh in all of Russia. In the 2010 census, only one ethnic Yugh was counted, while in the 2020 census, 7 ethnic Yugh were counted.

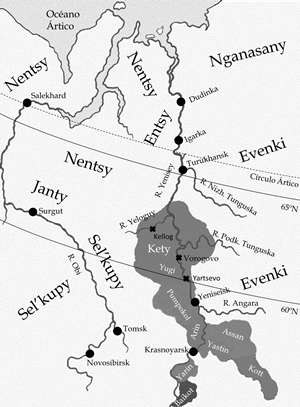
Yenisean languages
