= Xeglun =

Tungusic mythological creature

Xeglun is the celestial elk in Tungusic mythology. It was Mangi (Xargi)'s pursuit of this creature that was said to have created the Milky Way.
