= Eskeri =

Eskeri is the Tungus creator god. He retrieved magic mud from the primeval waters and used it to form the Earth.
