= Oroqen people =

Ethnic group in northern China

Oroqen Alternative names: Elunchunzu, Orochon, Orochen
Oroqen

Total population
- c. 9,168 (est.)

Regions with significant populations
- China: Heilongjiang, Inner Mongolia
- China: 9,168 (2020 census)

Languages
- Oroqen, Chinese

Religion
- Shamanism, Tibetan Buddhism

Related ethnic groups
- Evens, Evenks, other Tungusic peoples

The Oroqen or Orochen people (Oroqen: ɔrɔtʃeen; simplified Chinese: 鄂伦春族; traditional Chinese: 鄂倫春族; pinyin: Èlúnchūnzú; Mongolian: Orčun) are a Tungusic ethnic group native to Siberia and northern China. They form one of the 56 ethnic groups officially recognized by the People's Republic of China. The Oroqen people are largely concentrated in the northern Chinese provinces of Heilongjiang and Inner Mongolia, which are home to 45.54% and 41.94% of the 8,259 Oroqen people living in China. The Oroqen Autonomous Banner is also located in Inner Mongolia.

The Oroqens are mainly hunters, and customarily use animal fur and skins for clothing. Many of them have given up hunting and adhered to laws that aimed to protect wildlife in the People's Republic of China. The government has provided modern dwellings for those who have left behind the traditional way of life. The Oroqen are represented in the People's Congress by their own delegate and are a recognized ethnic minority.

In the Russian Empire, various peoples in various places were called Orochen (Russian: Ороченъ; orthography before Soviet reform), in several variants (орочон, орончон, орочен). One of the most commonly accepted hypotheses is that the term is derived from the Manchu language: орунчунь (orunchun) meaning "deer people", or "deer herders" (cf. pinyin "Èlúnchūn"). This is not a self-naming of these peoples, but an exonym, i.e., assigned to them by Manchu, Tungus, or Russians, sometimes due to misunderstanding. Therefore old documents speaking about orochon/orochen must be considered cautiously.

== Language ==
The Oroqen language is a Northern Tungusic language. Their language is very similar to the Evenki language and it is believed that speakers of these two languages can understand 70% of the other language. Their language is still unwritten; however, the majority of the Oroqen are capable of reading and writing Chinese, and some can also speak the Daur language.

== History ==
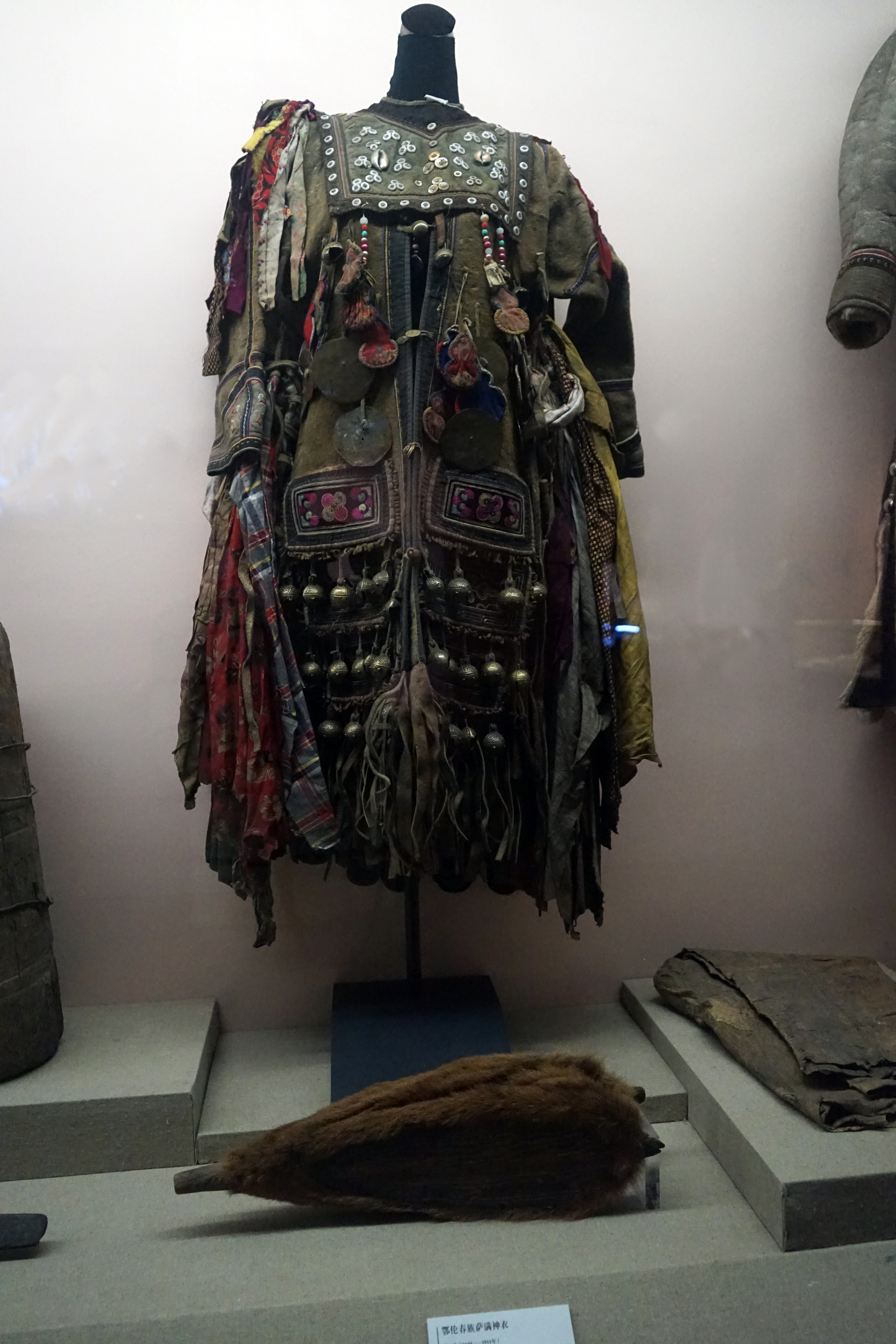
Oroqen shaman clothing

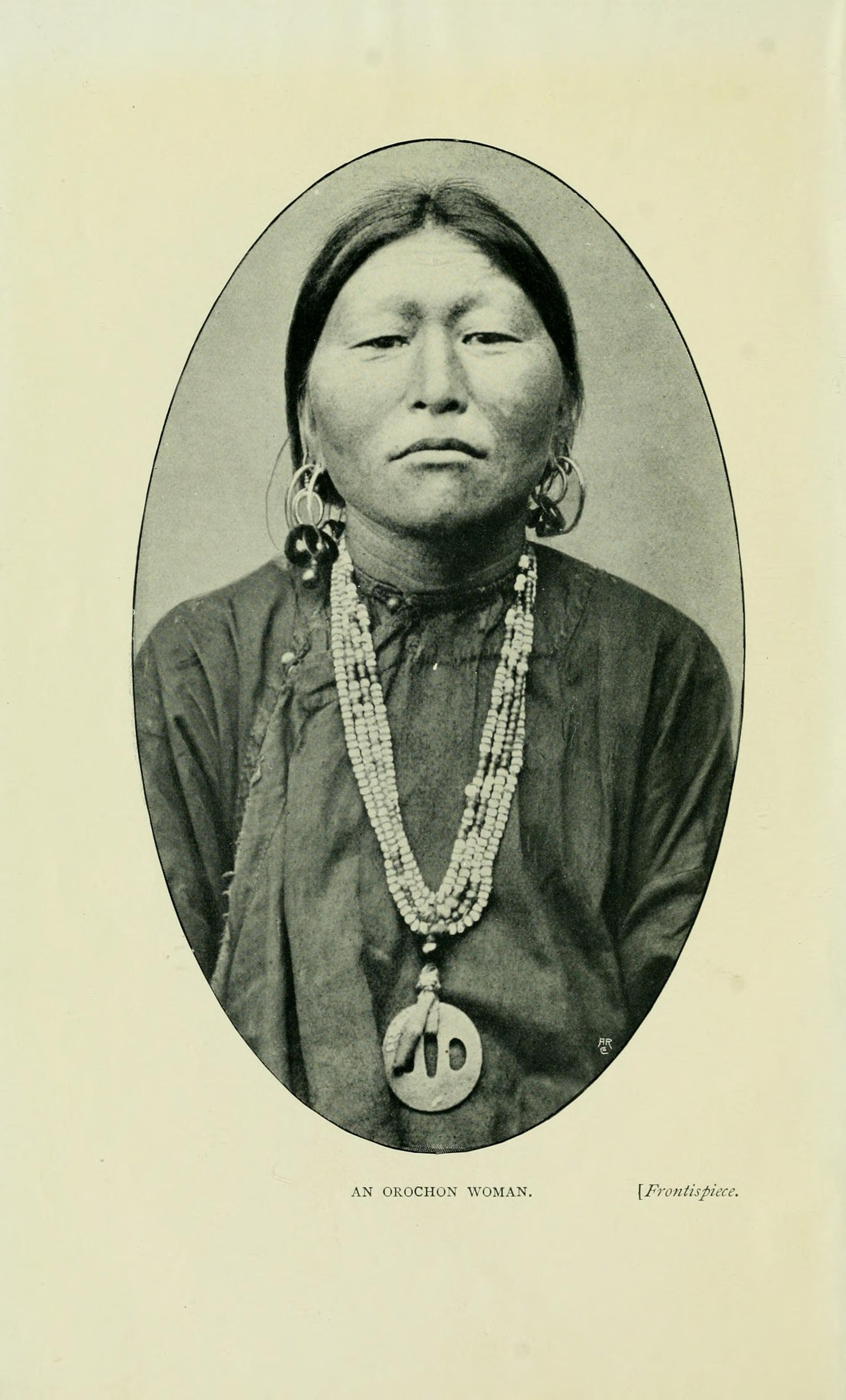
An Orochon woman, Sakhalin, 1903

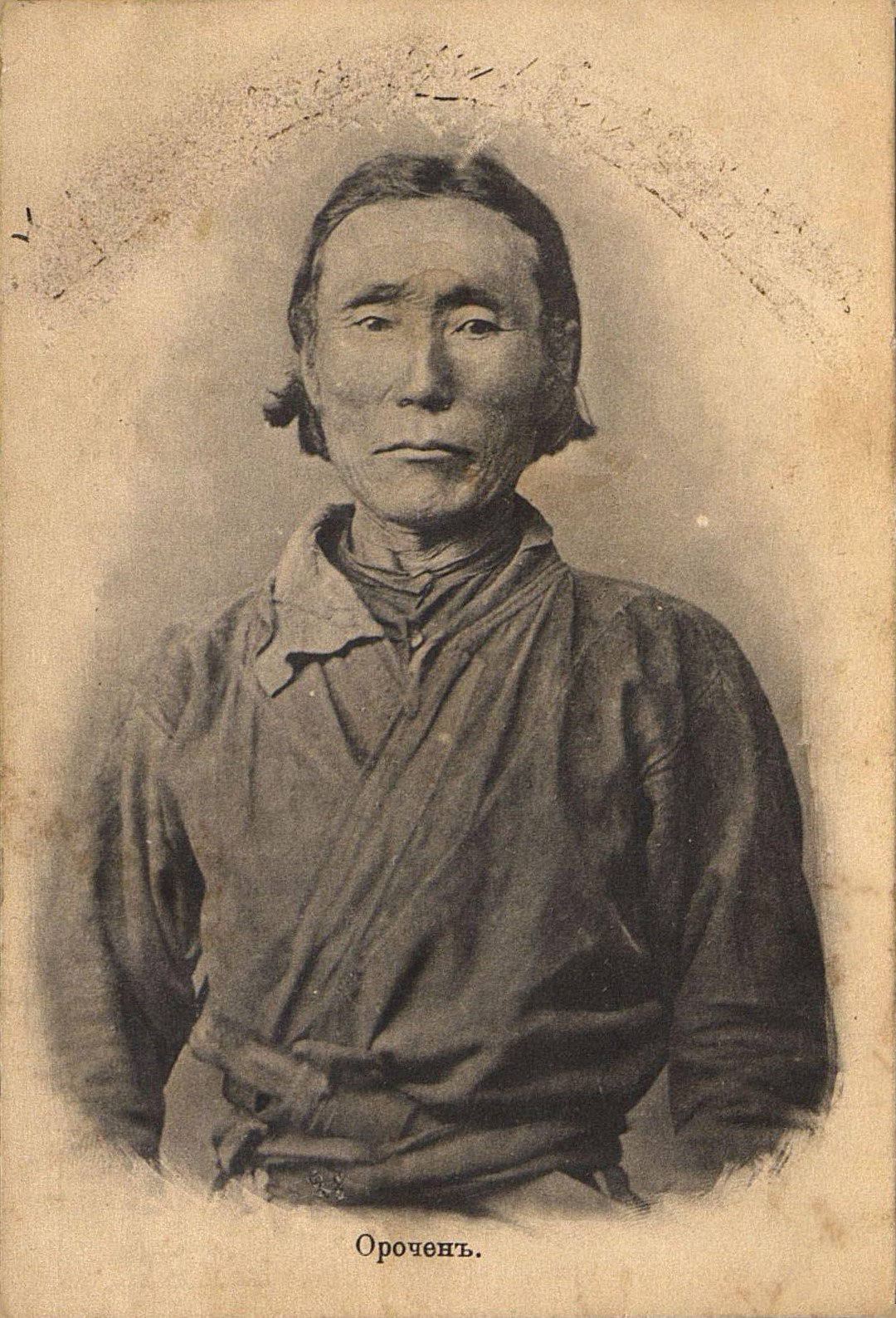
Orochen man, Russian Far East, 1900

The Oroqen (Mongolian Guruchin) are one of the oldest ethnic groups in northeast China. The endonym oroqen means "people who keep reindeer, reindeer herder(s)." The ancestor of the Oroqen originally lived in the vast area south of the Outer Khingan Mountains and north of Heilongjiang.

They once formed part of the ancient people known as the Shiwei. In the 17th century, following invasions by the Russian Empire, some Oroqens moved to the area near the Greater and Lesser Khingan Mountains.

During the Japanese occupation of Manchuria, the Oroqen suffered a significant population decline. The Japanese distributed opium among them and subjected some members of the community to human experiments, and combined with incidents of epidemic diseases this caused their population to decline until only 1,000 remained. The Japanese banned Oroqen from communicating with other ethnicities, and forced them to hunt animals for them in exchange for rations and clothing which were sometimes insufficient for survival, which lead to deaths from starvation and exposure. Opium was distributed to Oroqen adults older than 18 as a means of control. After 2 Japanese troops were killed in Alihe by an Oroqen hunter, the Japanese poisoned 40 Oroqen to death. The Japanese forced Oroqen to fight for them in the war which led to a population decrease of Oroqen people. Even those Oroqen who avoided direct control by the Japanese found themselves facing conflict from anti-Japanese forces of the Chinese Communists, which also contributed to their population decline during this period.

Following the expulsion of the Japanese from Manchuria, the Oroqen came under suspicion from the Chinese Communists as counterrevolutionaries and were subjected to persecution, particularly during the Cultural Revolution between 1966 and 1976. Some Oroqen were driven to suicide due to intense interrogation by Chinese Communist authorities, as well as having to endure public humiliations and beatings.

== Culture ==
The Oroqen are exogamous, only marriages among members of different clans being permitted.

The traditional dwelling is called a sierranju (Chinese: 斜仁柱; pinyin: xiérénzhù) and is covered in the summer with birch bark and in the winter with deer furs. These dwellings have conical forms and are made out of 20 to 30 pine sticks. The dwellings are usually about six meters in diameter and five meters in height. In the centre a fire is placed that serves as a kitchen, as well as a source of lighting. Birch bark is an important raw material in the traditional culture alongside the furs. It serves for the preparation of containers of all types, from the manufacture of cradles to boats. With respect to the reindeer herding of the Evenki, Oroqen and Nanai, which all shared the use of birch bark, it can be said that these cultures are part of a "birch bark" culture.

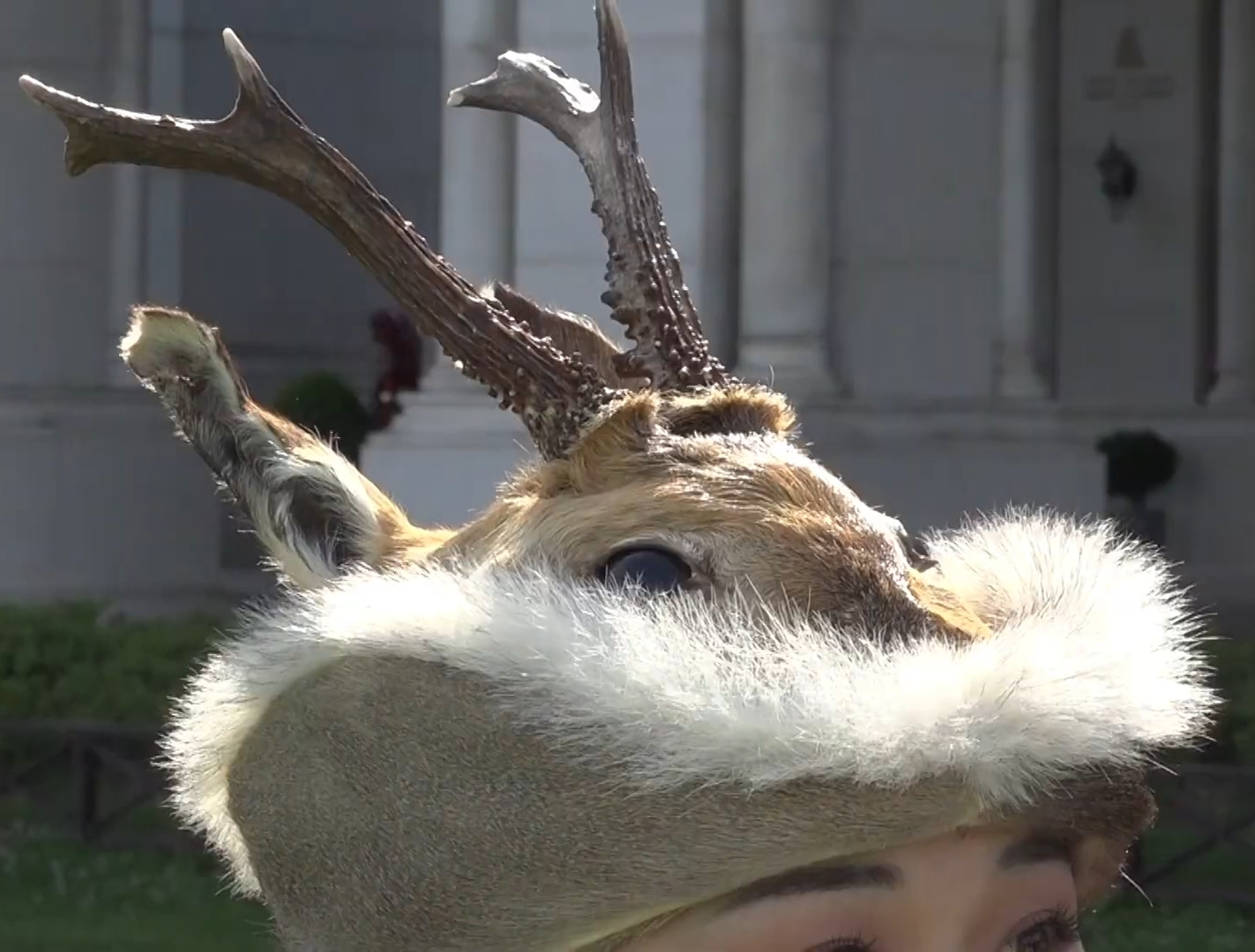
Traditional headwear of the Oroqen people

Traditional clothing was primarily made from deer or seal skin, and stitching was done using needles and sinew (animal tendons). In particular, winter garments required fur linings, which were essential for surviving the extreme cold.

The Oroqen is now among China's most highly educated ethnic groups. 23.3% of the ethnic group received college education, only less than Russian Chinese, Chinese Tatars and Nanais. 19.2% received only primary school education or less, only higher than Koreans, Russian Chinese and Nanais.

== Religion ==
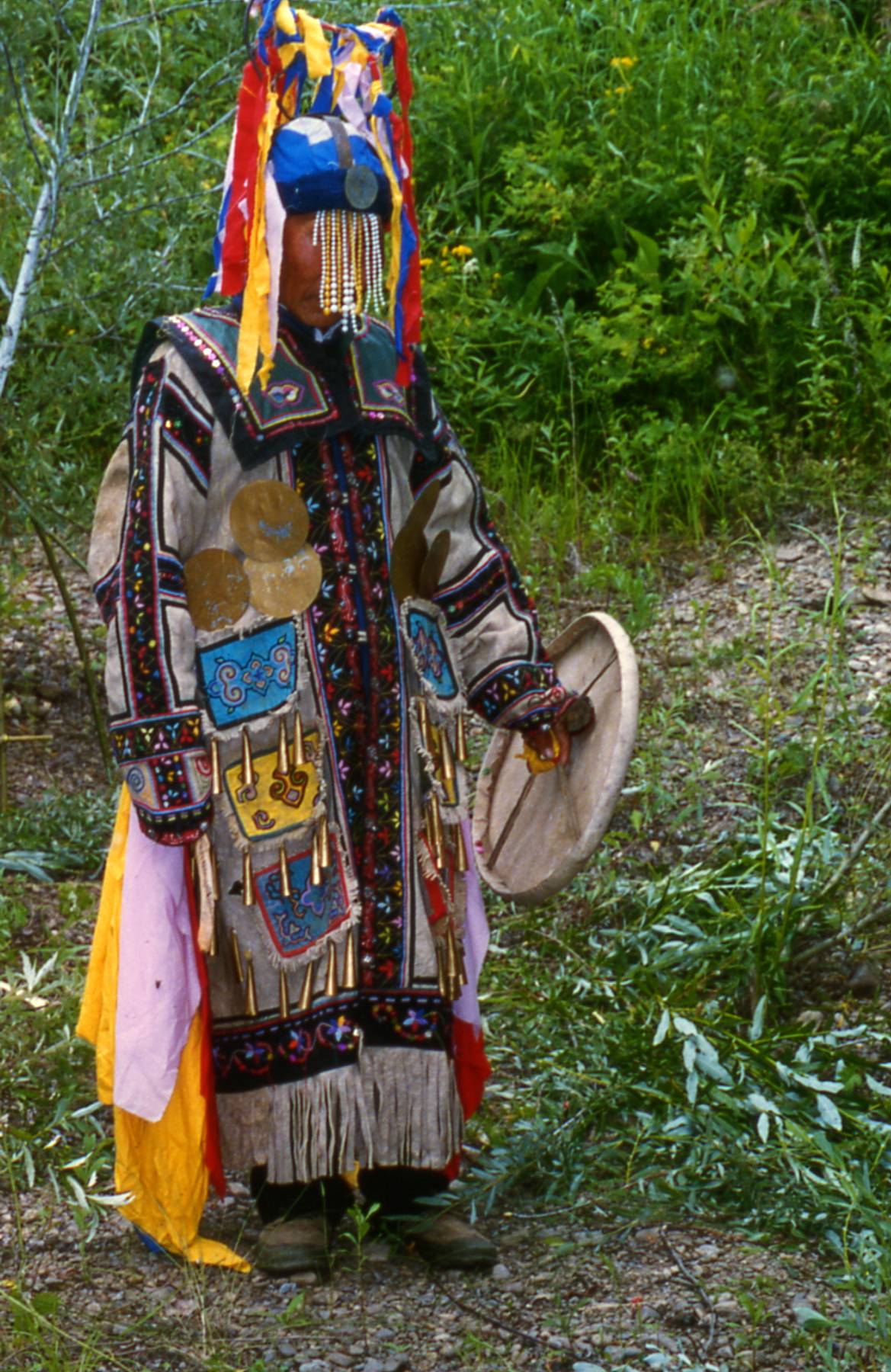
This is a photo of Chuonnasuan (1927–2000), the last shaman of the Oroqen people, taken by Richard Noll in July 1994 in Manchuria near the Amur River border between the People's Republic of China and Russia (Siberia). Oroqen shamanism is now extinct.

Until the early 1950s the main religion of the nomadic Oroqen was shamanism. In the summer of 1952 cadres of the Chinese Communist Party coerced the leaders of the Oroqen to give up their "superstitions" and abandon any religious practices. These tribal leaders, Chuonnasuan (Meng Jin Fu) and Zhao Li Ben, were also powerful shamans. The special community ritual to "send away the spirits" and beg them not to return was held over three nights in Baiyinna and in Shibazhan.

The last living shaman of the Oroqen, Chuonnasuan (Chinese: 孟金福; pinyin: Mèng Jīn Fú), died at the age of 73 on 9 October 2000. His life, initiatory illness, and training as a shaman are detailed in a published article, also available online.

Chuonnasuan was the last living shaman who practiced his craft prior to the communist banishment of such "superstitions" in this region in 1952. Over three nights in July 1952, in several separate communities, the Oroqen peoples held rituals in which they begged the spirits to leave them forever. Evidence for and enhancement of auditory (spirit songs) and visual mental imagery during altered states of consciousness can be found in Chuonnasuan's account of his practice of shamanism. Noteworthy is that he reported performing only one ritual journey to the lower world, which he called Buni. This term for the lowerworld or land of the dead is identical to that used by the Nanai people of Siberia in accounts of shamans collected almost a century ago. Sacrifices to ancestral spirits are still routinely made, and there is a folk psychological belief in animism.

Traditionally the Oroqen have a special veneration for animals, especially the bear and the tiger, which they consider their blood brothers. The tiger is known to them as wutaqi, which means "elderly man", while the bear is amaha, which means "uncle“.

== Cultural revival initiatives ==
For tourism and other cultural activities, there are presently three new museums in the Autonomous Banner, one of which is dedicated to The Northern Wei Dynasty.
