= Vorogovo =

Vorogovo Ворогово
- Selo
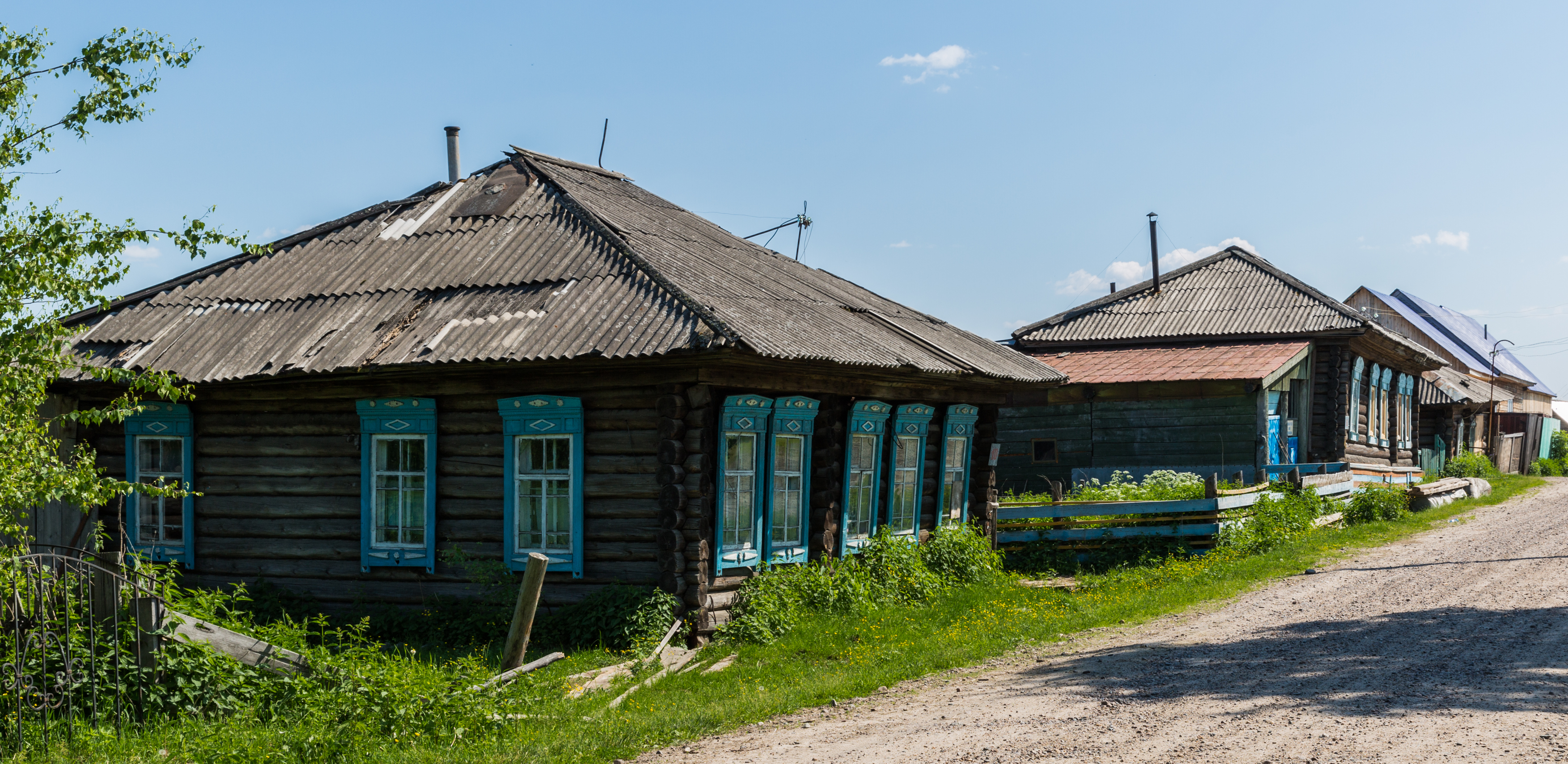
- Interactive map of Vorogovo
- Location of Vorogovo Vorogovo (Krasnoyarsk Krai)
- Country: Russia
- Federal subject: Krasnoyarsk Krai
- Founded: 1637

Population (2010 Census)
  - Total: 856
  - Estimate (2010): 856 (0%)
- Time zone: UTC+7 (MSK+4)
- Postal code: 663248
- OKTMO ID: 04654413101

Vorogovo (Russian: Ворогово) is a rural locality (selo) in Turukhansky District, Krasnoyarsk Krai. It had a population of 856 in 2010, a decrease from its 2002 population of 1104. It was one of the last strongholds of the now-extinct Yugh language.

== Climate ==
Vorogovo has a subarctic climate (Dfc).
