= Yugh language =

Extinct Yeniseian language of Russia

Yugh
- Sym Ket, Yug
- Дьуʼк Dʲuˀk
- Pronunciation: [dʲuʔk˥˧]
- Native to: Russia
- Region: Yenisei River
- Ethnicity: 7 Yughs (2020)
- Extinct: by 1972; 2–3 nonfluent speakers (1991); 3 (2020)
- Language family: Yeniseian: Ketic; Yugh

Language codes
- ISO 639-3: yug – inclusive code Individual code: yuu – (deprecated)
- Glottolog: yugh1239 yugh1240 additional bibliography
- ELP: Yug
- Map of pre-contact Yeniseian languages.

- Yug is classified as Extinct by the UNESCO Atlas of the World's Languages in Danger (2010)

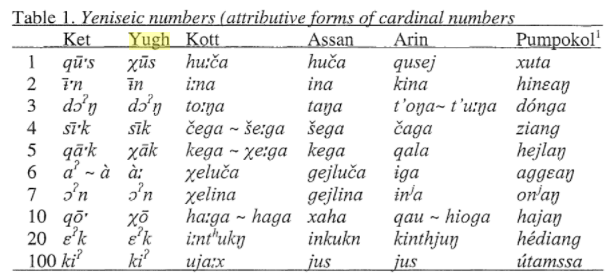
Numerals in Yeniseian languages

Yugh (/ˈjuːɡ/ YOOG; Yug, Yug: Дьуʼк, romanized: Dʲuˀk, Yug pronunciation: [dʲuʔk˥˧]) is a Yeniseian language, closely related to Ket, formerly spoken by the Yugh people, one of the southern groups along the Yenisei River in central Siberia. It went extinct by 1972. It was once regarded as a dialect of the Ket language, which was considered to be a language isolate, and was therefore called Sym Ket or Southern Ket; however, the Ket considered it to be a distinct language. By the early 1990s there were only two or three nonfluent speakers remaining, and the language was virtually extinct. The 2002 census recorded 19 ethnic Yugh in all of Russia. In the 2010 census, only one ethnic Yugh was counted, also stating their proficiency in Yugh, while in the 2020 census, 7 ethnic Yugh were counted, 3 of them stating that they were speakers of Yugh.

== Phonology ==
=== Vowels ===
Vowels of Yugh
	Front	Central	Back
Close	i [i]	ɨ [ɨ]	u [u]
Close-mid	e [e]	ə [ə]	o [o]
Open-mid	ɛ [ɛ]	ʌ [ʌ]	ɔ [ɔ]
Open		a [a]	

=== Consonants ===
Consonants of Yugh
		Labial	Alveolar	Alveolo- Palatal	Palatalized	Velar	Uvular	Laryngeal/ Pharyngeal
Plosive	voiceless	p [p]	t [t]		tʼ [tʲ]	k [k]	(q [q])	ʔ [ʔ]
Plosive	voiced	b [b]	d [d]		dʼ [dʲ]	g [g]		
Fricative	voiceless	f [f]	s [s]	š [ʃ]	šʼ [ʃʲ]		χ [χ]	
Fricative	voiced	(v [v])	z [z]	ž [ʒ]	žʼ [ʒʲ]	[ɣ]	(R [ʁ])	
Affricate			(c [t͡s])	čʼ [t͡ʃ]				
Nasal		m [m]	n [n]		nʼ [nʲ]	ŋ [ŋ]		
Trill			[r]					
Lateral			l [l]		lʼ [lʲ]			
Approximant					j [j]			
