= Xianbei =

Para-Mongolic ancient people

Xianbei 鮮卑 Xiānbēi
- 3rd century BC–3rd century AD
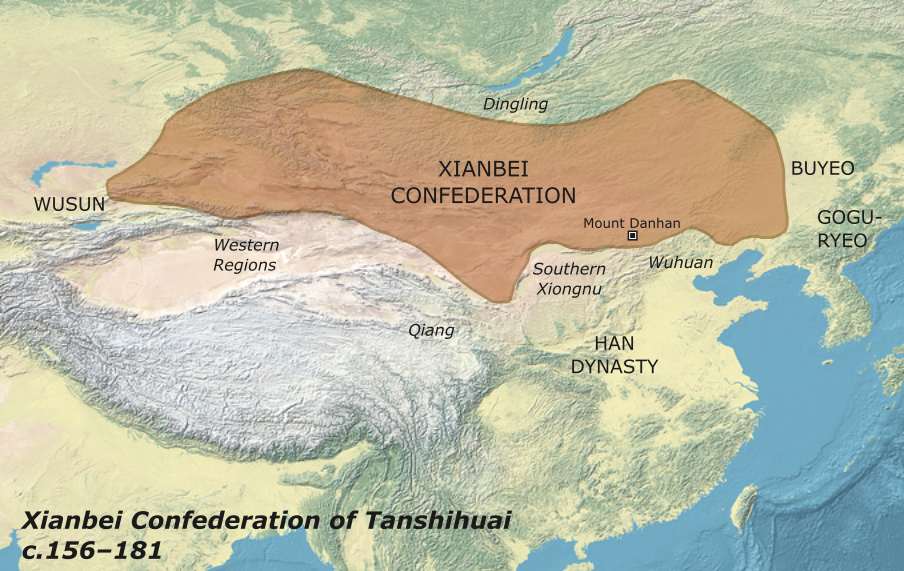
- Territory of the Xianbei Confederation under Tanshihuai during the late 2nd century. It spanned from the Liao River in the east to the borders of the Wusun in the west. North of them were the Dingling people that resided south of Lake Baikal.
- Status: Nomadic empire
- Capital: Mount Danhan (around present-day Shangyi County, Hebei)
- Common languages: Xianbei
- Religion: Shamanism; Tengrism; Buddhism
- Government: Tribal confederation
- Chieftain
  - c. 156–181: Tanshihuai
  - c. 181–189: Helian
  - c. 190s: Kuitou
- Historical era: Antiquity
  - Established: 3rd century BC
  - Disestablished: 3rd century AD

Area
- 200: 4,500,000 km^{2} (1,700,000 sq mi)
Preceded by	Succeeded by
Xiongnu	Rouran Khaganate; Dai (Sixteen Kingdoms)

Xianbei
- Traditional Chinese: 鮮卑
- Simplified Chinese: 鲜卑
Transcriptions
Standard Mandarin
- Hanyu Pinyin: Xiānbēi
- Gwoyeu Romatzyh: Shianbei
- Wade–Giles: Hsien^{1}-pei^{1}
- IPA: [ɕjɛ́n.péɪ]
Yue: Cantonese
- Yale Romanization: Sīn bēi
Southern Min
- Hokkien POJ: Sian-pi
Middle Chinese
- Middle Chinese: Sjen-pjie
Old Chinese
- Baxter–Sagart (2014): *S[a]r-pe

The Xianbei (/ʃjɛnˈbeɪ/; simplified Chinese: 鲜卑; traditional Chinese: 鮮卑; pinyin: Xiānbēi) were an ancient nomadic people who inhabited parts of present-day northeastern China, Inner Mongolia, and the eastern Eurasian steppe. The Xianbei were likely not of a single ethnicity, but rather a multilingual, multi-ethnic confederation consisting of mainly Proto-Mongols (who spoke either pre-Proto-Mongolic, or Para-Mongolic languages), and, to a minor degree, Tungusic and Turkic peoples. They originated from the Donghu people who splintered into the Wuhuan and Xianbei when they were defeated by the Xiongnu at the end of the 3rd century BC. In the 1st century BC, the Xianbei began engaging in the conflict between the Han dynasty and the Xiongnu, culminating in the Xianbei replacing the Xiongnu on the Mongolian Plateau.

The chieftain Tanshihuai unified the Xianbei in the mid-2nd century and waged war against the Han dynasty but the Xianbei splintered following his death in 181 AD. After suffering several defeats by the end of the Three Kingdoms period, the Xianbei migrated southwards and settled close to Han society and submitted to the Chinese dynasties. As one of the "Five Barbarians", they fought as auxiliaries for the Western Jin dynasty during the War of the Eight Princes and the Upheaval of the Five Barbarians before declaring independence while the Jin were pushed out from northern China. During the Sixteen Kingdoms period, the Xianbei founded several short-lived states and established themselves in the Central Plains.

The Xianbei were at one point all subjected to the Di-led Former Qin dynasty before it fell apart not long after its defeat in the Battle of Fei River. In the wake of the Qin collapse, the Tuoba founded the Northern Wei dynasty and reunited northern China, ushering China into the Northern and Southern dynasties period. The Northern dynasties, all of which were either led or heavily influenced by the Xianbei, opposed and promoted sinicization at one point or another but tended towards the latter, merging with the general Chinese population by the Tang dynasty. The Northern Wei Emperor Xiaowen in particular implemented policies that suppressed Xianbei customs while promoting Han culture at court such as language, dress, and rituals. He arranged for ethnic Han elites to marry daughters of the Tuoba imperial clan in the 480s AD. More than fifty percent of Tuoba Xianbei princesses of the Northern Wei were married to southern Han men from the imperial families and aristocrats of the Southern dynasties who defected and joined the Northern Wei.

== Etymology ==
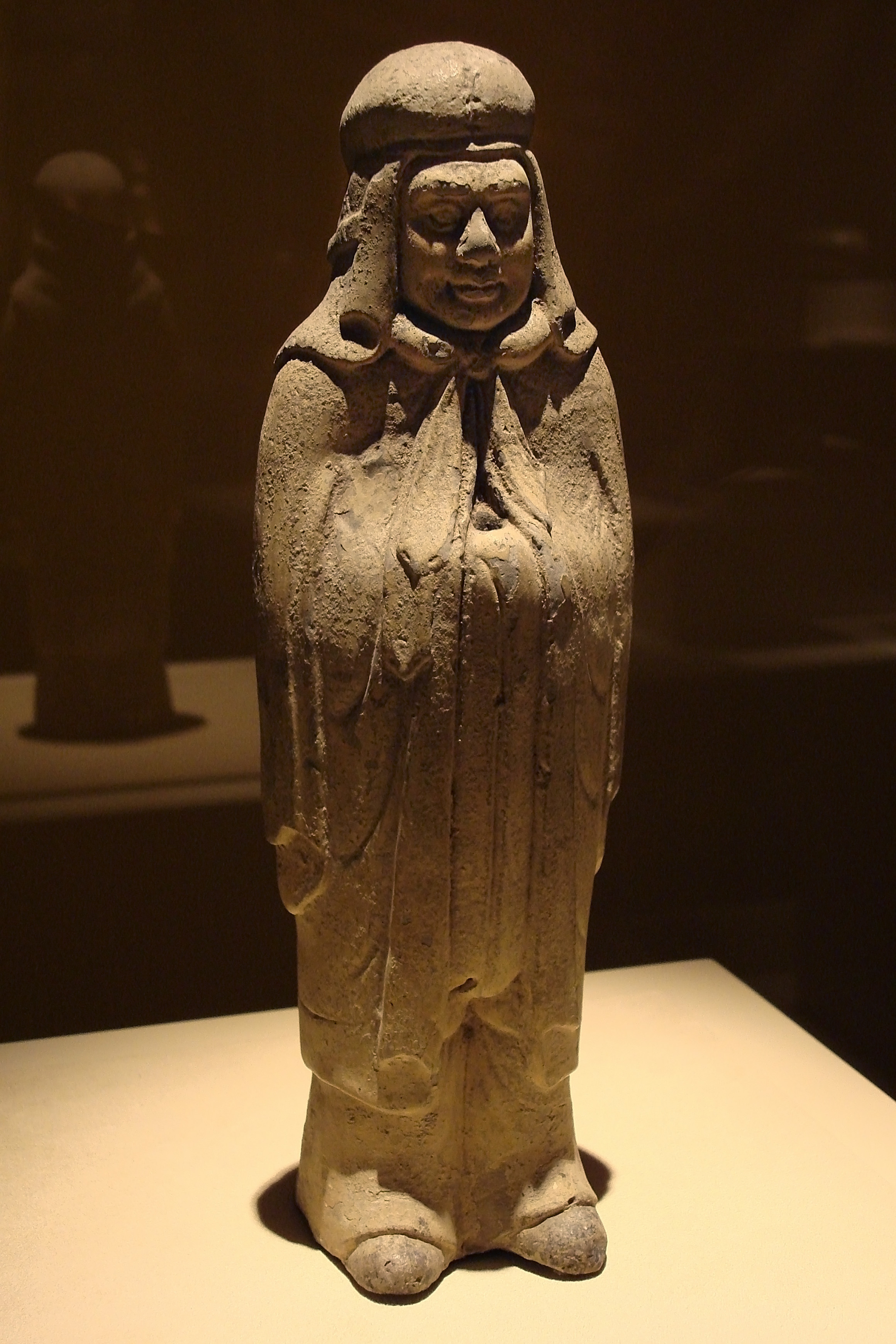
Figure of a Xianbei warrior from the Northern dynasties (286–581) era. The figure wear a covered "wind hat", trousers, short upper tunic, and a cape tied around the neck, designed to protect against the wind and dust.

Paul Pelliot tentatively reconstructs the Eastern Han Chinese pronunciation of Xianbei (鮮卑) as */serbi/, from *Särpi, after noting that Chinese scribes used 鮮 to transcribe Middle Persian sēr (lion) and 卑 to transcribe foreign syllable /pi/; for instance, Sanskrit गोपी gopī "milkmaid, cowherdess" became Middle Chinese 瞿卑 (ɡɨo-piᴇ) (> Mand. qúbēi).

On the one hand, *Särpi may be linked to the Mongolic root *ser ~*sir which means "crest, bristle, sticking out, projecting, etc." (cf. Khalkha сэрвэн serven), possibly referring to the Xianbei's horses (semantically analogous with the Turkic ethnonym Yabaqu < Yapağu 'matted hair or wool', later 'a matted-haired animal, i.e. a colt'). On the other hand, the Book of the Later Han and the Book of Wei stated that before becoming an ethnonym, Xianbei had been a toponym, referring to the Great Xianbei mountains (大鮮卑山), which is now identified as the Greater Khingan range (simplified Chinese: 大兴安岭; traditional Chinese: 大興安嶺; pinyin: Dà Xīng'ān Lǐng).

Schuessler (2014) reconstructs 鮮卑's Old Chinese pronunciation in the 1st century BCE as *sen-pe, and Eastern Han Chinese pronunciation as sian pie; while reconstructing no syllable coda -r for 鮮's pronunciation in any of those two stages, Schuessler remarks that "[i]n syllable-final position n represents foreign n as well as r and perhaps l", and still derives both *sian pie and *sen-pe from foreign *Särbi.

Shimunek (2018) reconstructs *serbi for Xiānbēi and *širwi for 室韋 Shìwéi < MC *ɕiɪt̚-ɦʉi.

== History ==
=== Origin ===
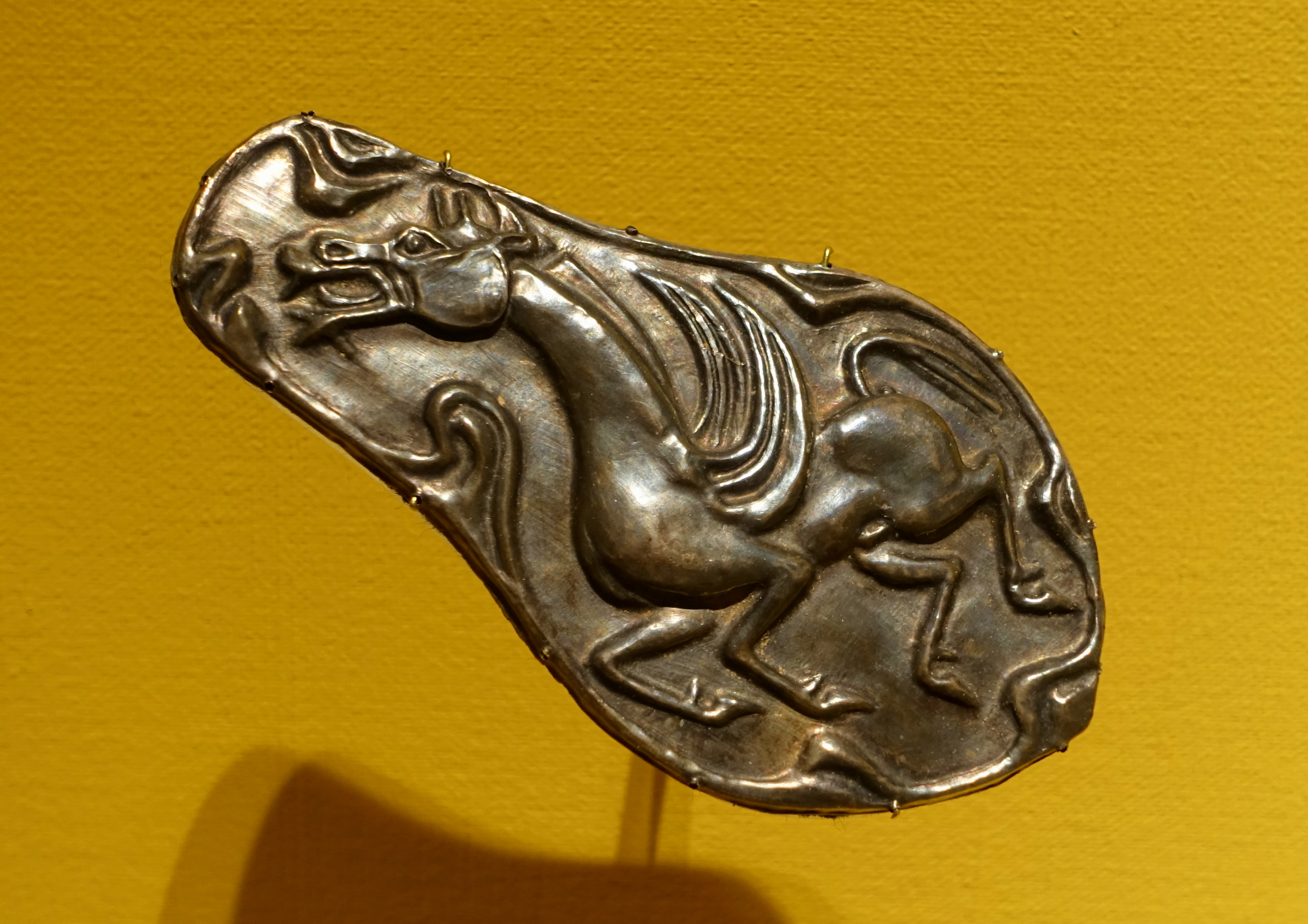
Flying Horse plaque, Xianbei culture, Inner Mongolia province, China. 1st century BC to 1st century AD.

Warring States period's Chinese literature contains early mentions of Xianbei, as in the poem The Great Summons in the anthology Chu Ci and possibly the chapter "Discourses of Jin 8" in the Guoyu. (Note: Zhang Zhengming (2017) accepts the reading 鮮卑 (also seen in the early 19th century version published by Jinzhang bookstore (錦章図書局) in Shanghai) as the ethnonym of the people who accompanied the Chu. However, 鮮卑 Xianbei is likely a scribal error for 鮮牟 Xianmou (as in other versions like Sibu Congkan (四部叢刊), or Siku Quanshu (四庫全書)). Eastern Wu scholar Wei Zhao states that the 鮮牟 Xianmou were an Eastern Yi nation, while the 鮮卑 Xianbei were of Mountain Rong origin. The apparent scribal error results in contradicting statements, apparently by Wei Zhao, that the Xianbei were an Eastern Yi nation and a people of Mountain Rong origin. Huang Pilie (1763–1825) states that the reading 鮮卑 Xianbei was inauthentic and identifies the 鮮牟 Xianmou with 根牟 Genmou, an Eastern Yi nation conquered by the Lu state in the 9th year of Duke Xuan of Lu's reign (600 BCE).) However the early appearance of the word xianbei in the Chu ci refers to a belt buckle rather than a people.

The first time the Xianbei people appeared in recorded history was in the Book of the Later Han, compiled in the 5th century. According to the Book of the Later Han, the Xianbei were originally a branch of the Donghu people together with the Wuhuan (or Wuwan) and "the language and culture of the Xianbei are the same as the Wuhuan". When the Donghu "Eastern Barbarians" were defeated by the Xiongnu leader Modu Chanyu around 208 BC, the Donghu splintered into the Xianbei and Wuhuan. The Xianbei were driven into the Khingan Mountains in northeastern Inner Mongolia. The Xianbei practiced some agriculture, or at least more than the Xiongnu. They wielded bows made of horn and produced fur garments made of sable and other pelts. Archaeological remains of a Han dynasty Xianbei site in northeastern Inner Mongolia include skeletons of roebuck, deer, wild pigs, and hunting tools.

Since the Xianbei are described as identical to the Wuhuan in culture and language, it can be assumed that descriptions of the Wuhuan apply to the Xianbei as well. According to a description of the Wuhuan by a Chinese historian who died in 266, they were nomads who moved to find new land for herds to graze, although they also practiced some agriculture. They took the personal names of their strongmen as their surnames. Family life was matriarchal except when it came to warfare. However these might just be stereotypes to reinforce a non-Chinese "other" by the authors.

The first significant contact the Xianbei had with the Han dynasty was in 41 and 45, when they joined the Wuhuan and Xiongnu in raiding Han territory.

In 49, the governor Ji Tong convinced the Xianbei chieftain Pianhe to turn on the Xiongnu with rewards for each Xiongnu head they collected.

In 54, Yuchouben and Mantou of the Xianbei paid tribute to Emperor Guangwu of Han.

In 58, the Xianbei chieftain Pianhe attacked and killed Xinzhiben, a Wuhuan leader causing trouble in Yuyang Commandery.

In 85, the Xianbei secured an alliance with the Dingling and Southern Xiongnu.

In 87, the Xianbei attacked the Xiongnu chanyu Youliu and killed him. They flayed him and his followers and took the skins back as trophies.

In 91, the Northern Xiongnu were defeated by the Han dynasty and the Xianbei began occupying the Mongolian Plateau, absorbing 100,000 Xiongnu tribes and increasing their strength.

In 109, the Wuhuan and Xianbei attacked Wuyuan Commandery and defeated the local Han forces. The Southern Xiongnu chanyu Wanshishizhudi rebelled against the Han and attacked the Emissary Geng Chong but failed to oust him. Han forces under Geng Kui retaliated and defeated a force of 3,000 Xiongnu but could not take the Southern Xiongnu capital due to disease among the horses of their Xianbei allies.

The Xianbei under Qizhijian raided Han territory four times from 121 to 138. In 145, the Xianbei raided Dai Commandery.

=== Xianbei Confederation ===
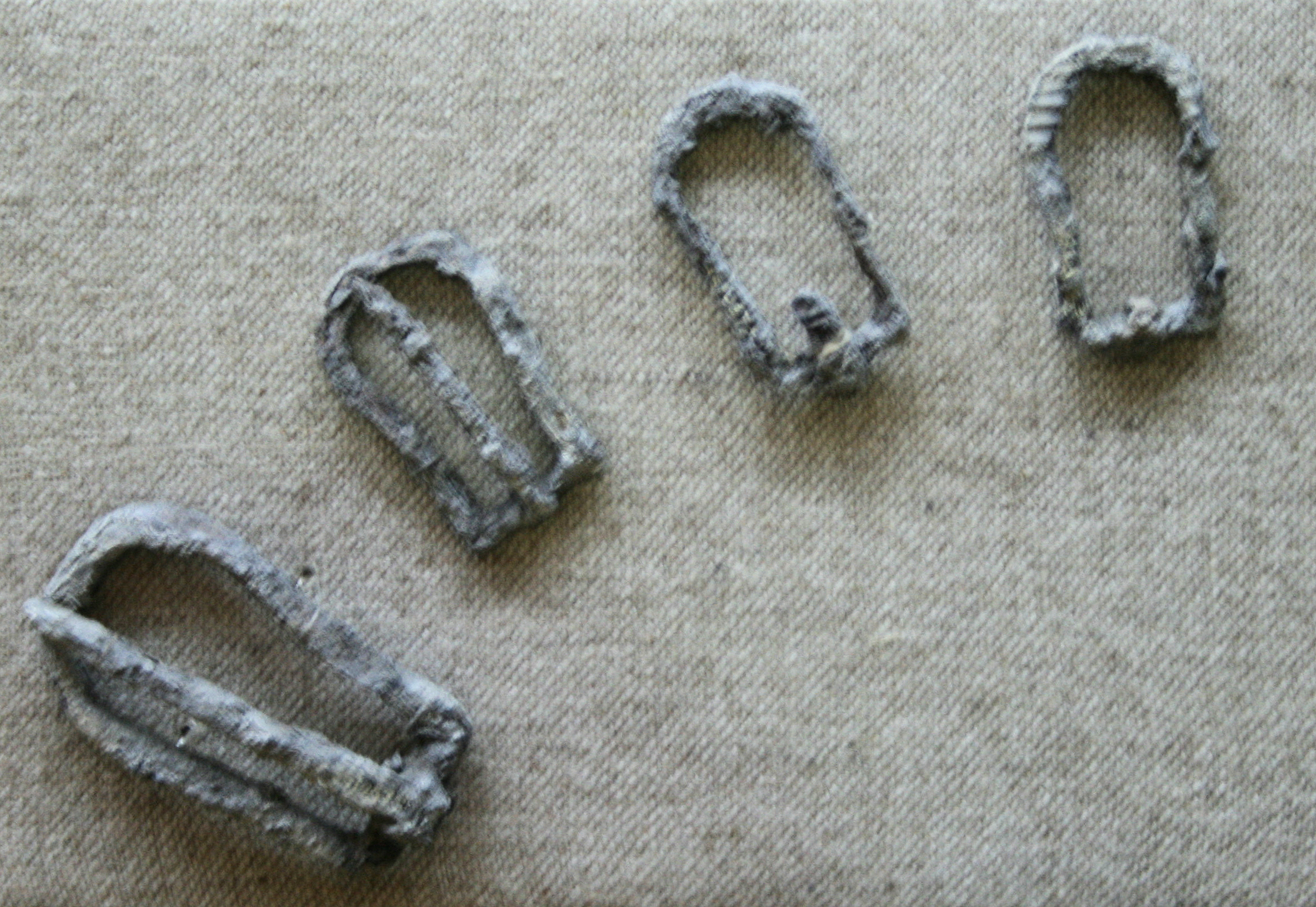
Han-era Xianbei belt fasteners from a Xianbei tomb in Yushu, Jilin

Around the mid-2nd century, a chieftain, Tanshihuai, unified the Xianbei tribes and established an imperial court at Mount Danhan (in present-day Shangyi County, Hebei). When he was 14 or 15 years old, another tribe stole cattle and sheep from his family. He pursued the thieves and retrieved their livestock. He became a great chieftain and eventually united the tribes covering all the former Xiongnu lands.

Claiming the title of Daren (大人; "Elder"), Tanshihuai attacked the Wusun in the west and repelled the Dingling from the north and Buyeo from the east. He divided the Xianbei empire into three sections, each governed by an appointed chieftain.

Tanshihuai of the Xianbei divided his territory into three sections: the eastern, the middle and the western. From the You Beiping to the Liao River, connecting the Fuyu and Mo to the east, it was the eastern section. There were more than twenty counties. The darens (chiefs) (of this section) were called Mijia 彌加, Queji 闕機, Suli 素利 and Huaitou 槐頭. From the You Beiping to Shanggu to the west, it was the middle section. There were more than ten counties. The darens of this section were called Kezui 柯最, Queju 闕居, Murong 慕容, et al. From Shanggu to Dunhuang, connecting the Wusun to the west, it was the western section. There were more than twenty counties. The darens (of this section) were called Zhijian Luoluo 置鞬落羅, Rilü Tuiyan 曰律推演, Yanliyou 宴荔游, et al. These chiefs were all subordinate to Tanshihuai.

— Records of the Three Kingdoms

Throughout his reign, Tanshihuai aggressively raided the Han dynasty's northern borders, with his first recorded raid being in 156. In 166, he allied with the Southern Xiongnu and Wuhuan to attack Shaanxi and Gansu. These raids devastated the border commanderies and claimed many lives. Though the Han was able to repel them at times, they were concerned that they would not be able to subdue Tanshihuai. The Han attempted to appease him by offering him the title of King, but Tanshihuai rejected them and continued to harass their borders. By 168, there were annual raids on the Han frontier.

In 177, Xia Yu, Tian Yan and the Southern Xiongnu chanyu, Tute Ruoshi Zhujiu led a force of 30,000 against the Xianbei. They were defeated and returned with only one-tenth of their original forces. A memorial made that year records that the Xianbei had taken all the lands previously held by the Xiongnu and their warriors numbered 100,000. Han deserters who sought refuge in their lands served as their advisers and refined metals as well as wrought iron came into their possession. Their weapons were sharper and their horses faster than those of the Xiongnu. Another memorial submitted in 185 states that the Xianbei were making raids on Han settlements nearly every year.

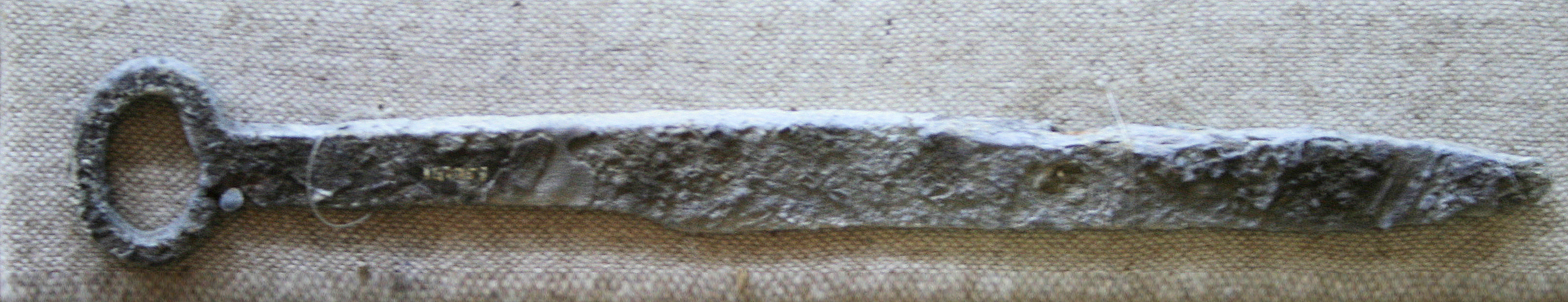
Iron broadsword, Xianbei nation during the Han dynasty (206 BC to 220 AD), from a Xianbei tomb in Yushu, Jilin Province

Despite the constant raids, the loose Xianbei confederacy lacked the organization of the Xiongnu Empire, and they were struggling to sustain their growing population. Tanshihuai died in 181 and was succeeded by his son, Helian, but his poor leadership caused half of his followers to rebel before he was killed while raiding Beidi during the last years of Emperor Ling of Han. Helian's son, Qianman was too young at the time of his father's death, so the chieftains elected his nephew, Kuitou, to succeed him. Once Qianman came of age, however, he challenged his cousin to succession, destroying the last vestiges of unity among the Xianbei.

=== Three Kingdoms ===
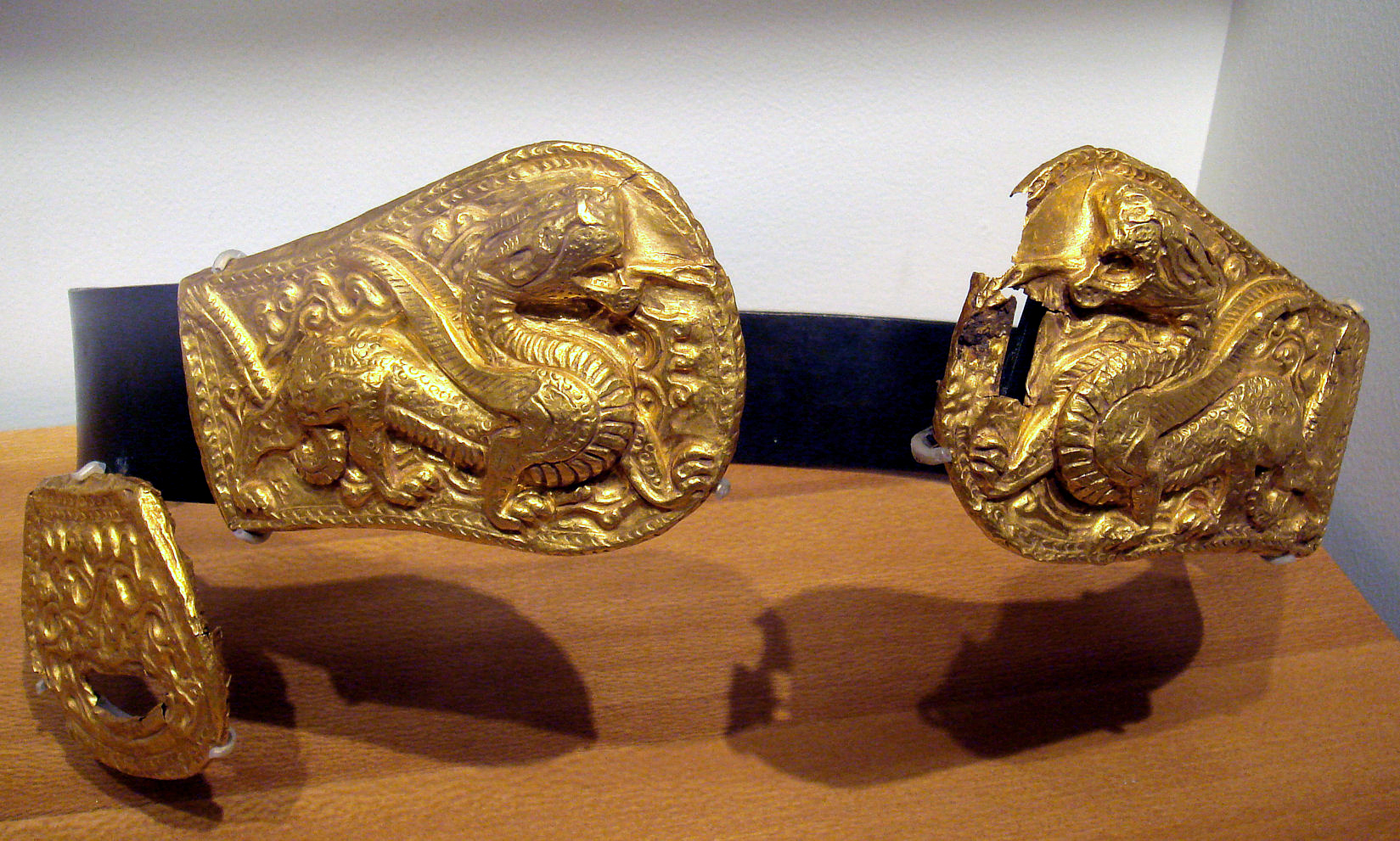
Xianbei belt buckles, 3–4th century AD

By the Jian'an era (196–220), the Xianbei had already split into many different groups, including Kuitou in Inner Mongolia, Kebineng in northern Shanxi, and Suli, Mijia and Queji in northern Liaodong. Following his death in 205, Kuitou's territory was divided between his brothers, Budugen and Fuluohan. The fractured Xianbei tribes began to pay tribute and offer their vassalage to the Chinese court after the Han warlord Cao Cao destroyed the Wuhuan confederacy at the Battle of White Wolf Mountain in 207. In 218, the Wuhuan of Dai Commandery called upon Fuluohan to assist them in their rebellion, but the rebels later double crossed him in favour of Kebineng, who killed Fuluohan. Budugen went to the court of Cao Wei in 224 to ask for assistance against Kebineng, but he eventually betrayed them and allied with Kebineng in 233. Kebineng killed Budugen soon afterwards.

Kebineng was initially from a minor Xianbei tribe. He rose to power west of Dai Commandery by taking in Chinese refugees who helped him drill his soldiers and make weapons and armor. After the Wuhuan's defeat in 207, he sent tribute to Cao Cao, and later provided assistance against the rebel Tian Yin. In 218, Kebineng allied with the Wuhuan of Dai and killed Fuluohan, but they were then defeated and forced back across the frontier by Cao Zhang. In 220, he acknowledged Cao Pi as Emperor of Cao Wei, but soon turned on Wei for impeding his advances on another Xianbei chieftain, Suli. Kebineng conducted raids on Wei before he was assassinated by a Cao Wei agent in 235, after which his confederacy disintegrated.

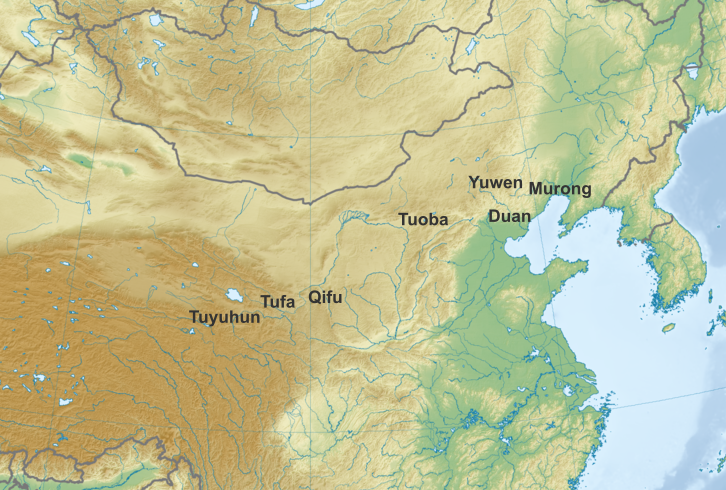
Distribution of major Xianbei clans in the early 4th century.

The other Xianbei tribes carried on with their southward migration, with some becoming vassals of Cao Wei and the succeeding Western Jin dynasty. In 258, the Tuoba tribe settled near the frontier and occupied the abandoned city of Shengle, north of the Yin Mountains. To the east of them, the Yuwen tribe began living between the Luan River and Liucheng, while the Murong tribe were permitted by the Chinese court to move deeper into the Liaodong Peninsula. In Liaoxi Commandery, a Xianbei ex-slave of the Wuhuan founded a tribe known as the Duan. To the far west, an offshoot of the Murong migrated into northern Qinghai and mixed with the native Qiang people, later becoming the Tuyuhun. The Qifu tribe gradually moved into the Longxi basin, while a branch of the Tuoba, the Tufa tribe, roamed the Hexi corridor. In 270, the Tufa chieftain, Shujineng, led the various ethnic tribes in the northwest in a rebellion against the Jin dynasty in Qin and Liang provinces but was defeated in 279 by Ma Long. By 280, the increase in the number of non-Han people in northern China was observable. An official warned that they lived as far south as Xi'an and Anyang, about three days away from the capital of Luoyang on horseback.

=== Sixteen Kingdoms ===
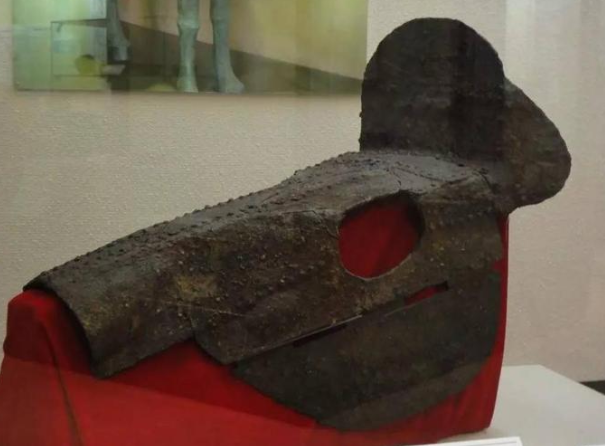
Horse armor from Northern Yan

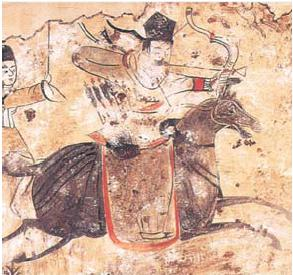
Painting depicting a Xianbei Murong archer in a tomb of the Former Yan (337–370).

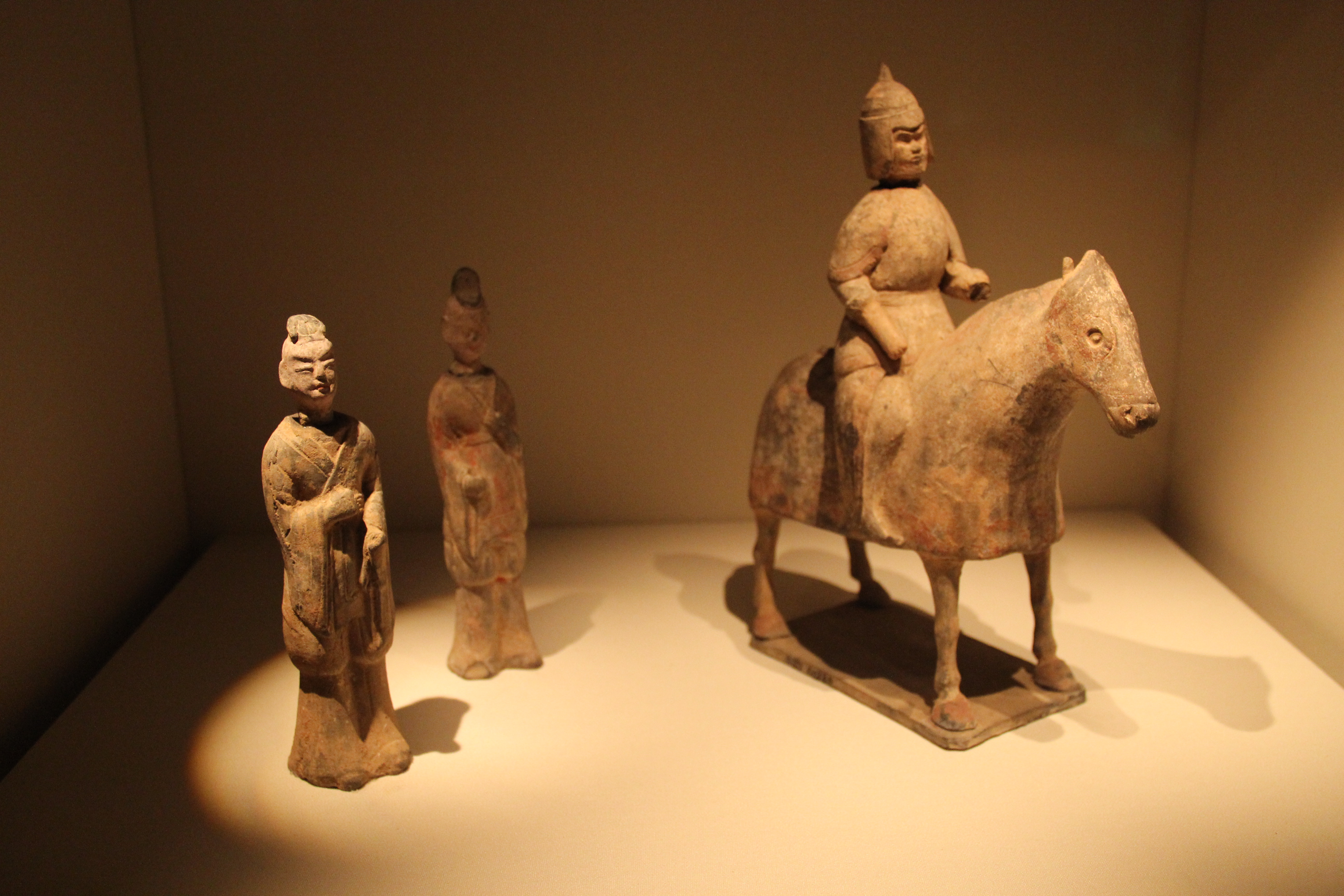
Northern Wei cavalry

At the turn of the 4th century, the Western Jin dynasty fought a series of bloody civil wars in the War of the Eight Princes. As fighting intensified, non-Han troops from the northern frontiers were brought in to revitalize the princes' armies. The Inspector of You province, Wang Jun, an important ally to one of the princes, had under his command a contigent of Xianbei and Wuhuan auxiliaries. These soldiers played a decisive role in the outcome of the wars, capturing Ye in 304 and Chang'an in 306, but also partook in their sackings. When the Xiongnu of Shanxi rebelled and founded the Han-Zhao dynasty in 304, the Tuoba lent their assistance to combat the rebels.

Along with the development of the stirrups, the Xianbei's horsemanship and access to steppe horses allowed them to assemble some of the most formidable heavy cavalry forces of the period. The Jin became increasingly reliant on the Xianbei to quell the widespread unrest in northern China, bestowing them with ducal titles in return for their loyalty and services. However, for various reasons, the Xianbei eventually withrew from the conflict, leaving the Jin to be overwhelmed by the Han-Zhao. A mass exodus of Chinese officers, soldiers and civilians fled to southern China, where the imperial court reestablished themselves as the Eastern Jin at Jiankang, but a number of them also turned north to seek refuge with the Xianbei.

For the next century, the Xianbei founded several of the Sixteen Kingdoms in northern China. Although the Tuoba later became the most important Xianbei faction, the Murong of Liaodong were the most prominent Xianbei people for the most part of the 4th century. The Murong were chieftains of the central portion of Tanshihuai's Xianbei empire. After Kebineng's death in 235, the Murong assisted the Cao Wei dynasty in ending the control of the Gongsun warlords in Liaodong in 238. The Murong chieftain was awarded with the title "Prince Acting in Accordance with Justice". The Murong settled in Liaodong and for the next generation assisted Cao Wei in their campaigns against Goguryeo. In 281, the Murong chieftain was awarded the title "Chanyu of the Xianbei".

In 294, Murong Hui (269–333) and some 10,000–20,000 followers moved to Jicheng near modern Jinzhou in Liaoning and started adopting Han-style institutions. According to Chinese histories, the Murong became almost "as Chinese as the Chinese emperors themselves". Murong Hui's son and heir established a Chinese school for the children of officials and personally supervised the exams. Despite adopting Han culture and actively associating with Han people, power over the military was securely held by only the Murong Xianbei and they remained conscious of their own separate identity. This separation of role and class was articulated in 401 by a Southern Liang commander who recommended settling Han people in the cities and encouraging them to take up farming while "we practice the methods of war to punish those who have not yet submitted". In other sectors of government, the Southern Liang had become a Chinese-style dynasty with reign periods, government institutions, and a Confucian school for the elite. The 4th century kingdoms that the Xianbei established presented themselves as both Han and Xianbei to different audiences. To tribal chieftains, their rulers were the chanyu while to the Han, their rulers were emperors.

In 337, Murong Huang proclaimed himself as the Prince of Yan, thereby founding the Former Yan (337–370), but still posing as a vassal to the Eastern Jin court. The Former Yan attacked Goguryeo in 342 and sacked its capital, taking the king's mother, wife, and even the corpse of the previous ruler along with 50,000 captives. The Murong also defeated the Duan in 338 and the Yuwen in 344. Five thousand Yuwen camps were relocated to the Murong stronghold while their chieftain fled to Goguryeo. The influx of Goguryeo and non-Murong people into Former Yan can be seen in the variety of burial styles in Liaodong after 289, however a native Murong style was dominant and could be seen even in tombs of known Han people. When northern China once again descended into civil war in 349, the Former Yan invaded the Central Plains, reaching the peak of their power as they conquered Hebei, Henan, Shandong and parts of Shanxi. In 352, Murong Jun proclaimed himself emperor, officially breaking away from the Jin.

Regardless of the identity of the ruling class and ruler, the assumption of Chinese titles and symbolic institutions was the norm as well for non-Xianbei states that neighbored them. Amidst internal fighting among the imperial family, the Former Yan themselves were conquered by the Former Qin in 370. The Former Qin were led by a Di ruler but upon triumphing over Former Yan, the Qin celebrated by making sacrifices to Confucius. After the Qin defeat at the Battle of Fei River in 383, a number of Yan revivalist regimes followed, namely the Later Yan (384–409), Western Yan (384–394) and Southern Yan (398–410), as well as the Northern Yan (409–436), which was ruled by a person of Han ancestry who had assimilated into Xianbei culture. In the west, confined within the region of Gansu, the Tufa and Qifu tribes also founded their own dynastic regimes, the Southern Liang (397–414) and Western Qin (385–431). The Murong were able to remain independent for a time before falling from power and being supplanted by the Tuoba.

=== Tuoba ===
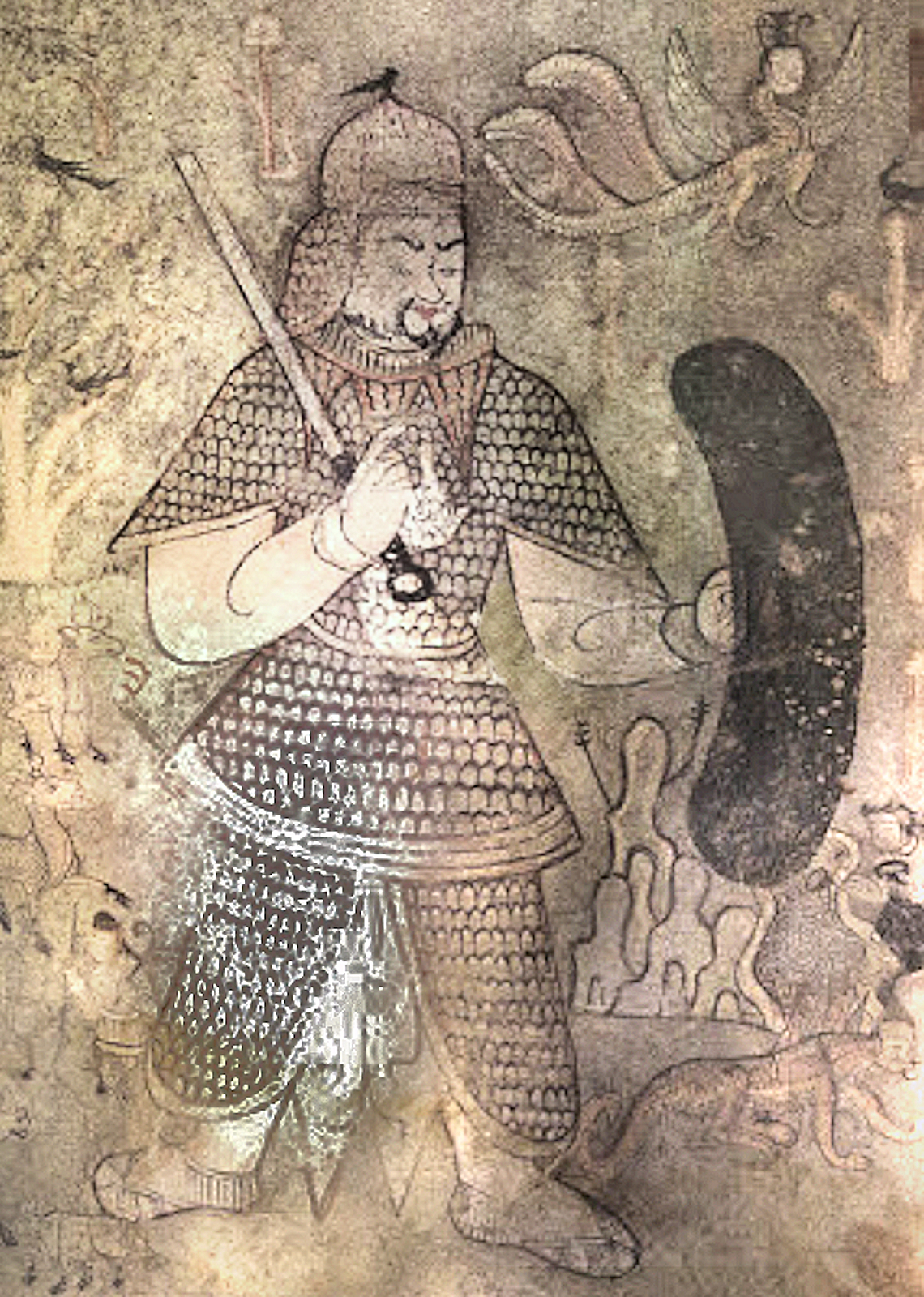
Soldier in tomb mural, Northern Wei, Datong

According to an inscription discovered at Gaxian Grotto in Oroqen Autonomous Banner in 1980, the Tuoba imperial ancestors used the title khan and khatun and it is speculated that the Tuoba were the first to use those titles.

According to a Tuoba legend in the Book of Wei, the Tuoba moved south from their original homeland to a "great marsh" that is believed to be Lake Hulun. In Tanshihuai's time in the 2nd century AD, the Tuoba moved south again to the Yin Mountains at the top of the Yellow River's northward loop. In 248, Tuoba Liwei killed the chieftain of the local tribe and absorbed them into his following. They moved to the northeastern corner of the Yellow River loop and built their capital city Shengle near modern Hohhot. The Tuoba established grazing lands between modern Datong and Taiyuan in Shanxi. This region came to be known as Dai (after a Chinese administrative unit) and formed the core of the later Northern Wei dynasty.

In 261, Tuoba Liwei sent his son as hostage to the court of Cao Wei where he stayed for six years. The son was later killed by his own people because they became suspicious of his behavior, which had become Chinese-like.

In Bing province, from his base at Jinyang by present-day Taiyuan, the Jin governor Liu Kun obtained the aid of the Tuoba. In 310 he sent his son as hostage to the Tuoba to obtain their troops and he became increasingly dependent on the chieftain Tuoba Yilu. In 314 the two Liu-Tuoba forces sent aid to Jin forces at Chang'an, and Tuoba Yilu was awarded the title "King of Dai". Two years later, Tuoba Yilu was assassinated and his clansmen broke the alliance with the Jin. Liu Kun fled northeast to the Duan Xianbei but was killed there in 318.

The Tuoba duchy of Dai (310–376) was elevated to a kingdom in 315. In 321, the Tuoba ruler was assassinated by the wife of another chieftain. The woman dominated Tuoba affairs for years before Tuoba Shiyiqian, a son of the assassinated leader, returned from being a hostage of Later Zhao and proclaimed himself King of Dai in 338. Having been exposed to Chinese institutions, Tuoba Shiyiqian (r. 338–376) established some Chinese-style official titles and a basic law code. Based on archaeological evidence, Tuoba material culture was still fairly similar to that of the Xiongnu at the start of the 4th century, but by the end of the century, the graves of the Tuoba elite near Hohhot were almost the same as contemporary Han tombs. However, despite adopting some Chinese practices, contemporary texts in the late 4th century still describe the Tuoba as rough and uncultured people who lacked even steel armor and sharp weapons.

The Tuoba were eventually conquered by the Former Qin in 376, bringing northern China into a brief period of unification. Their former domain was divided between two Xiongnu tribes, the Tiefu and Dugu. The young grandson of Shiyiqian, Tuoba Gui, was allowed to continue living in his homeland under the Dugu, with the hopes that he would reach adulthood and inherit the Prince of Dai title while remaining loyal to the Qin. However, after the Battle of Fei River, the Qin quickly disintegrated, as many of their vassals declared independence and attempted to restore their fallen kingdoms. In 386, Tuoba Gui restored the kingdom of Dai, but soon changed his dynasty's name to Wei (魏), becoming known in history as the Northern Wei dynasty (386–535).

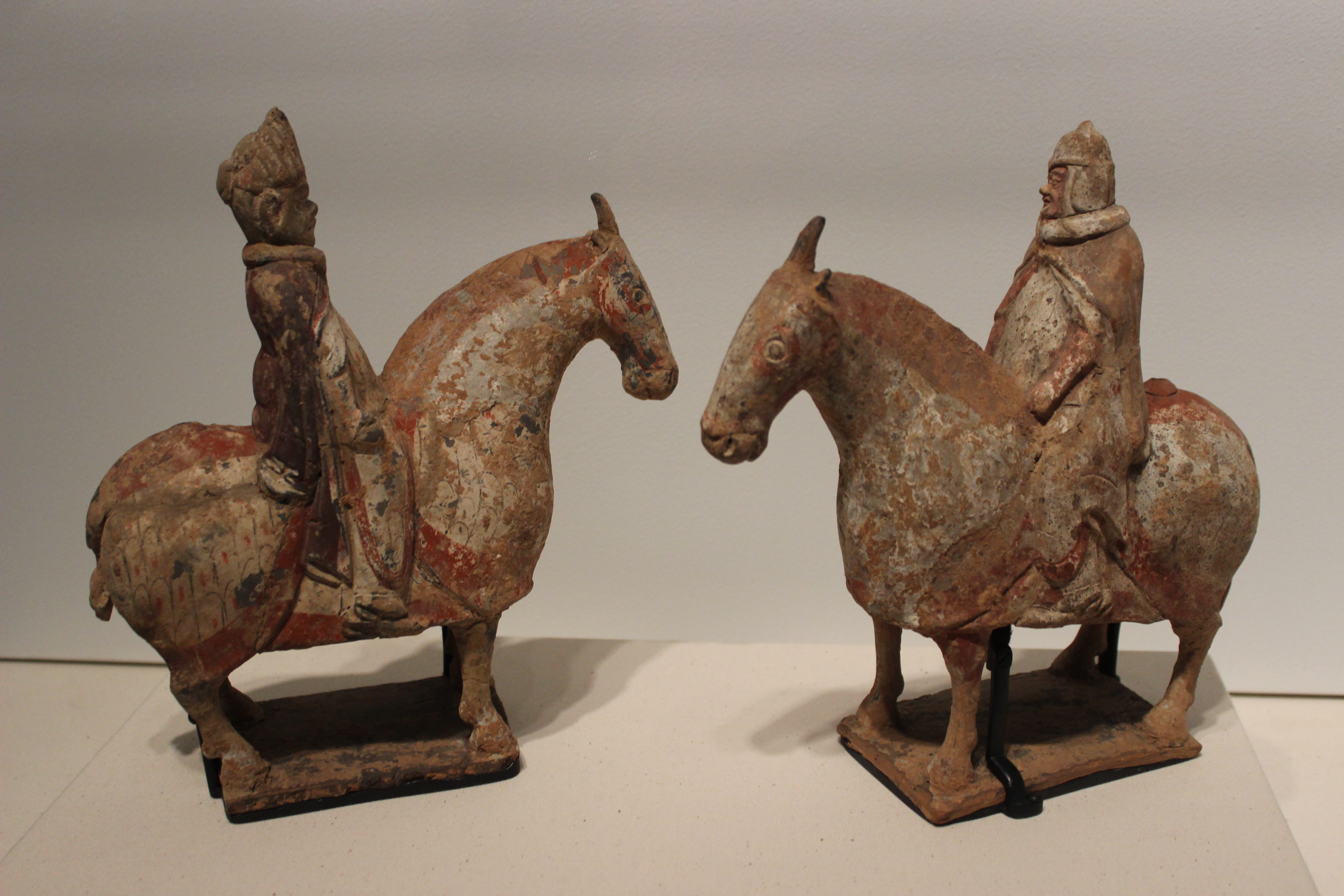
Northern Wei cavalry figurines

=== Northern Wei ===
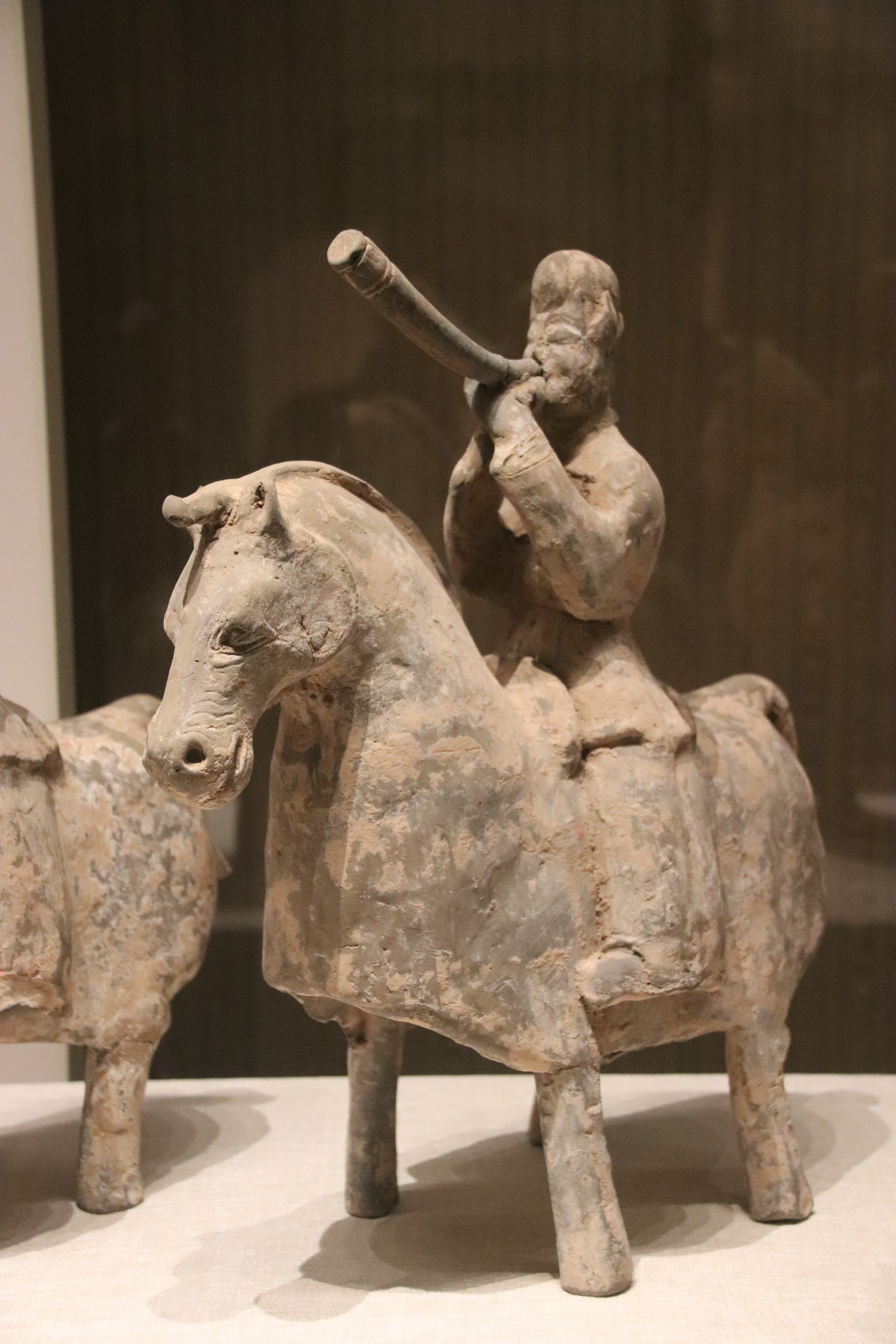
Pottery rider with blowing horn, Northern Wei

After Tuoba Gui (Emperor Daowu of Northern Wei) came to power, he started settling the Xianbei tribes in fixed locations. The threat of the Dugu and a rival claimant to his early reign forced him to submit to the more powerful Murong state of Later Yan. By 391, the Tuoba had subjugated many of their neighbouring tribes and grown strong enough on the northern grasslands to break off their alliance with Yan. In 395, the Murong launched a punitive expedition against Northern Wei, but were badly defeated at Canhe Slope. The next year, the Tuoba invaded Yan, and within three years, they took most of what is now Shanxi and Hebei while the Murong broke into two and were reduced to parts of Liaoning and Shandong.

In 398, Tuoba Gui was formally enthroned as emperor. He built a new capital called Pingcheng (modern Datong) and relocated 360,000 Murong and Goguryeo people to populate it, as well as an additional 100,000 artisans. Over the next 50 years, more than a million people were forced to relocate to the region around Pingcheng to increase its agricultural base. As Tuoba Gui expanded Northern Wei's territory further south, he integrated Han elites and parts of their culture into his government. In 399, Tuoba Gui ordered for book collections to be acquired throughout the realm and for Erudites (boshi) to teach the Chinese classics. Students in the Taixue increased.

Tuoba Gui started the practice of killing the mother of the heir apparent which would last for over seven generations. He became increasingly erratic later in his life, possibly due to taking a "cold food powder", a popular medicine at the time composed of five different minerals. Sometimes he did not eat for days and had trouble sleeping at night. In 409, Tuoba Gui was contemplating killing the mother of one of his sons in preparation for his role as heir apparent. The son broke into the palace at night and killed his father.

By the reign of the third Northern Wei emperor, Emperor Taiwu of Northern Wei (r. 424–452), all of northern China had been conquered. The rise of Xianbei military power was based on cavalry, which benefited from the double stirrup that is first attested to in a Northern Yan tomb dated to 415, as well as the use of heavy armor. The sight of over a thousand Xianbei cavalry in colorful armor was said to have intimidated a southern rebel army in 410. The Tuoba consolidated their power over the Central Plains by maintaining a Xianbei-dominated military class. As the general Gao Huan put it, the Chinese "bring you [the Xianbei] your supplies and clothing", and the Xianbei "fight for you [the Chinese] and enable you to have peace and order."

For a century after Tuoba Gui's formal accession as emperor in 398, 73% of all official posts were held by the Xianbei and 93% were held by people from the Dai region around the capital. Nomadic traditions such as livestock herding and hunts still played a major role in the early Northern Wei period, and Emperor Taiwu reportedly possessed two million horses, a million camels, and countless sheep and cattle to the west of the Yellow River. In 450, he emphasized the importance of cavalry to the Xianbei.

At the same time, a number of Han people rose to prominence in the dynasty and the Chinese histories are replete with mentions of how the Xianbei emperors praised the Han for their literary accomplishments. Taiwu noted that Cui Hao's cultural and literary abilities exceeded those of armored soldiers. Cui Hao was entrusted with writing the history of Northern Wei but was later put to death for describing the Tuoba's barbarian origins. Taiwu's successor, Emperor Wencheng of Northern Wei (r. 452–462) remarked that the Xianbei nobility should feel ashamed for merely holding bow and blade while his Han official administered the country with a writing brush.

=== Empress Dowager Feng's sinicizing reforms ===
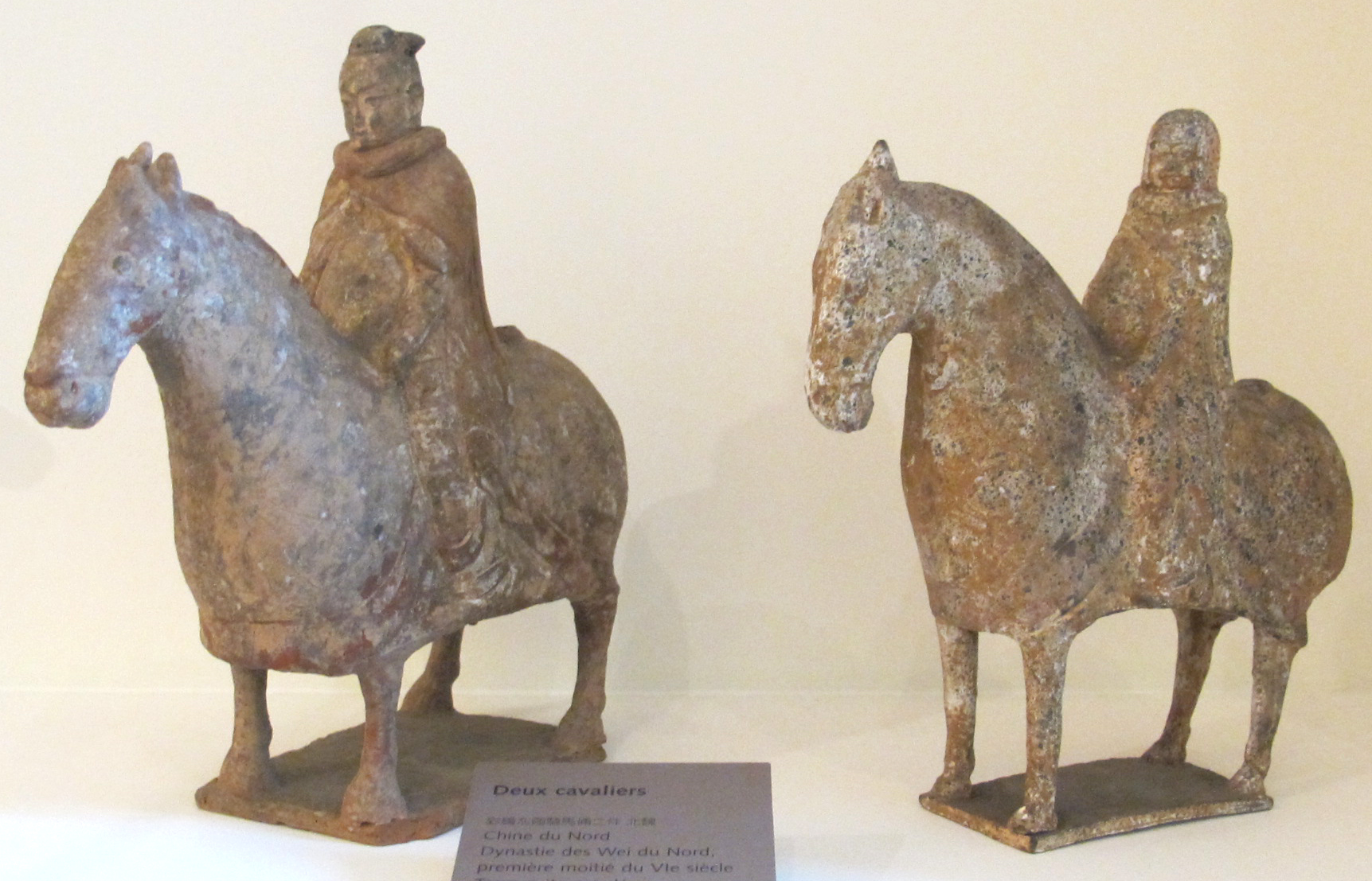
Northern Wei cavalry

Emperor Xiaowen of Northern Wei (r. 471–499) rejected the customs associated with his Xianbei ancestors and implemented reform policies to reconfigure the Northern Wei as a state based on Han culture. The policies of Xiaowen's reign are commonly attributed to his step-grandmother and also foster mother, Empress Dowager Feng (Wenming). Wenming came from a frontier family of probably mixed Han-Xianbei-Goguryeo descent. She was well learned in the Chinese classical tradition and inculcated in Xiaowen a sense of "filial piety" (xiao). Unlike previous Tuoba monarchs, Xiaowen fully obeyed his step-mother and often it was she who had final say on matters of administration. She maintained strict control over him. At one point when he was a boy, she considered him too smart and wise to be of use to her, so she locked him up in an unheated room during winter without food for three days. She was going to replace him with his brother after he died but was convinced by two courtiers to abandon this course. When Wenming died in 490, Xiaowen mourned her by abstaining from water and food for five days and then entered an elaborate mourning period according to Confucian norms. Xiaowen's posthumous name means "filial and cultured emperor".

Prior to Xiaowen, his grandfather Emperor Taiwu had exhibited an ad hoc approach to promoting Han culture such as sponsoring a Taoist sect and Confucian Academy based on the suggestion of Cui Hao, a Han minister. However, Taiwu also made an effort to maintain solidarity with the non-Han men that made up his army. Unlike Taiwu's policies, Xiaowen's sinicizing reforms were a forced culture change through rigid systematization and bitterly resisted. Xiaowen endeavored to reorganize the Tuoba Xianbei society along the lines of a Han patrilineal family and to prevent the consolidation of militarized communities with a shared sense of privilege. At least part of the reason for the implementation of reforms to curtail elite monopolization of land and military power was declining revenues. Income from military adventures had declined or even become unprofitable, causing the treasury to almost empty. There was also no system of regular salary for government officials, leading to corruption.

In 483, marriage between those with the same surname was banned according to Chinese marriage customs. The Book of Wei states that "Marriage is forbidden between the ten clans for a hundred generations". The ban on same surname marriages was expanded later on in the Northern Zhou dynasty (557–581) to include maternal surnames, effectively banning consanguineous marriage.

In 484, the government started paying civil officials a salary, which greatly benefited Han officials in the lower tiers without connections to the military.

In 485, a Han official recommended implementing the equal-field system, a census and land allocation program fusing social control and extraction of production. Although the proposal was officially accepted by Xiaowen, it was Wenming who read the proposal in court and she who made the decision to implement it. Government officials were sent out to assign every male over the age of 15 to 6.5 acres of agricultural land. Women were allotted half the land given to men. Additional land was also given to slaves and oxen. The tax system was reworked so that each husband-wife unit owed the state 13 bushels of grain and 7 bolts of fabric yearly with additional smaller levies for unmarried inhabitants, slaves, and oxen. Corvée service in the form of military service was also owed. By the end of the Northern Wei dynasty, some 5 million households were being taxed.

In 489 a Confucian temple was constructed in the capital and seasonal sacrifices were carried out in the spirit of Confucius.

=== Emperor Xiaowen's sinicizing reforms ===
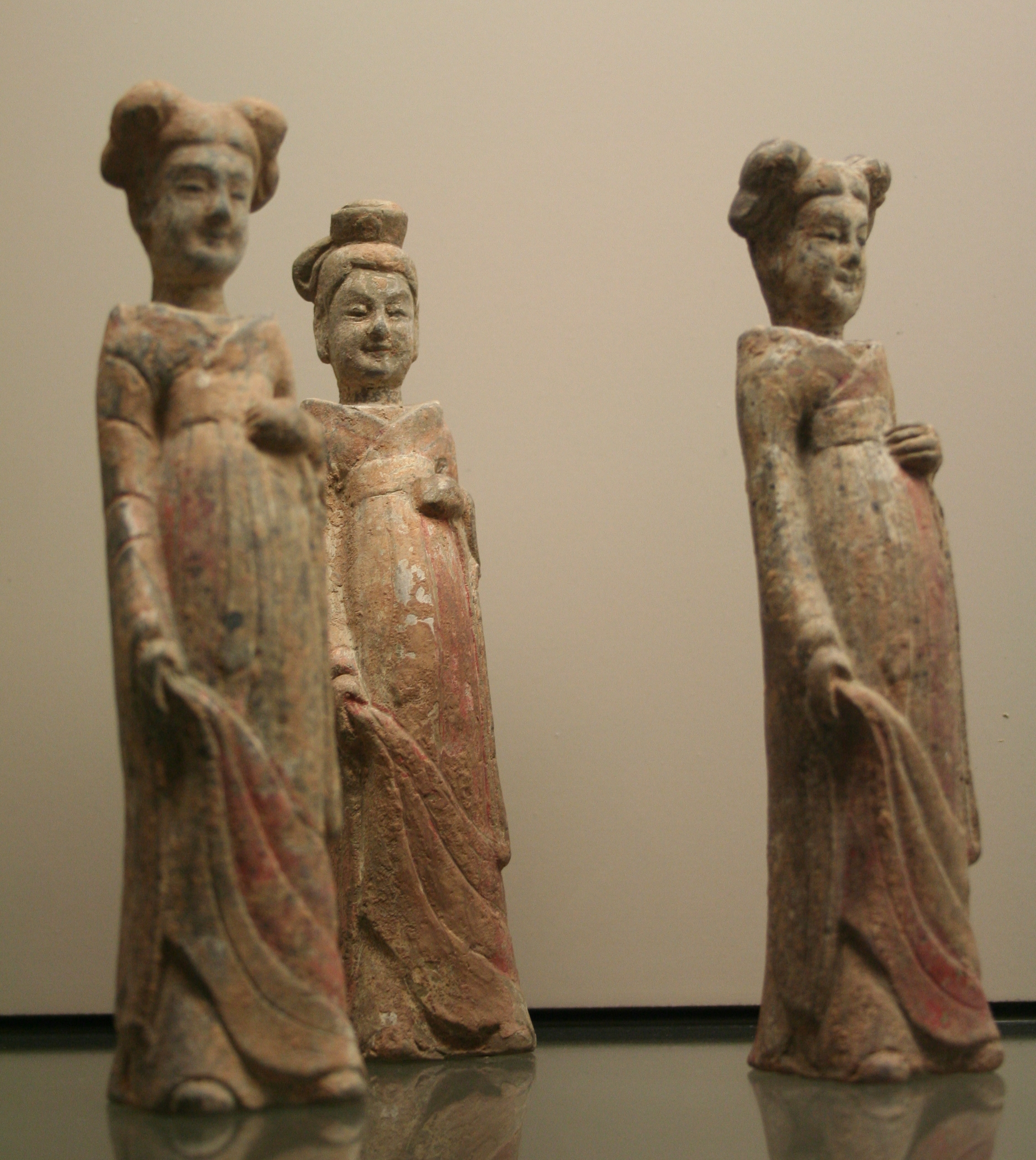
Female servant tomb figurines, Northern Wei

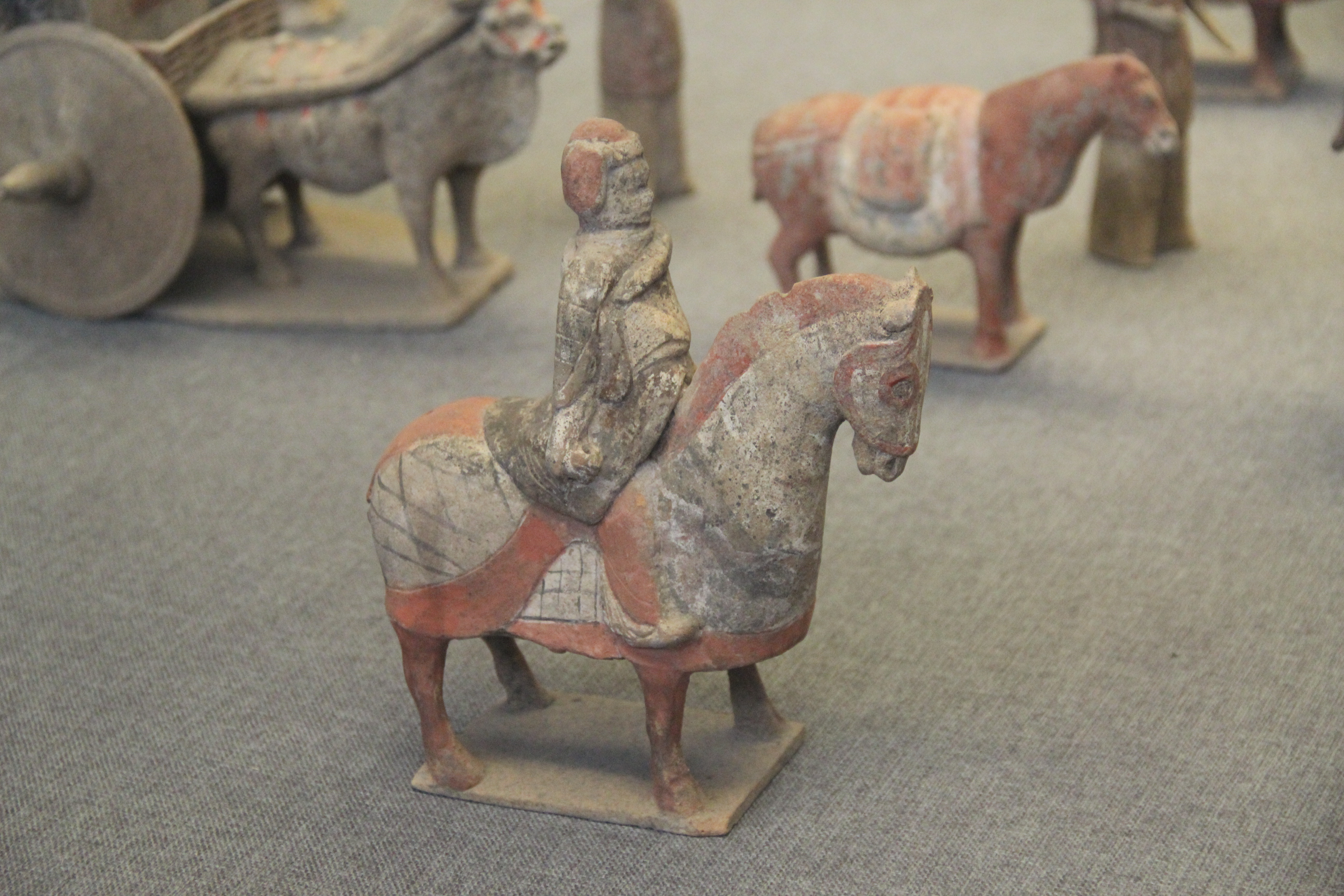
Northern Wei cavalry figurine

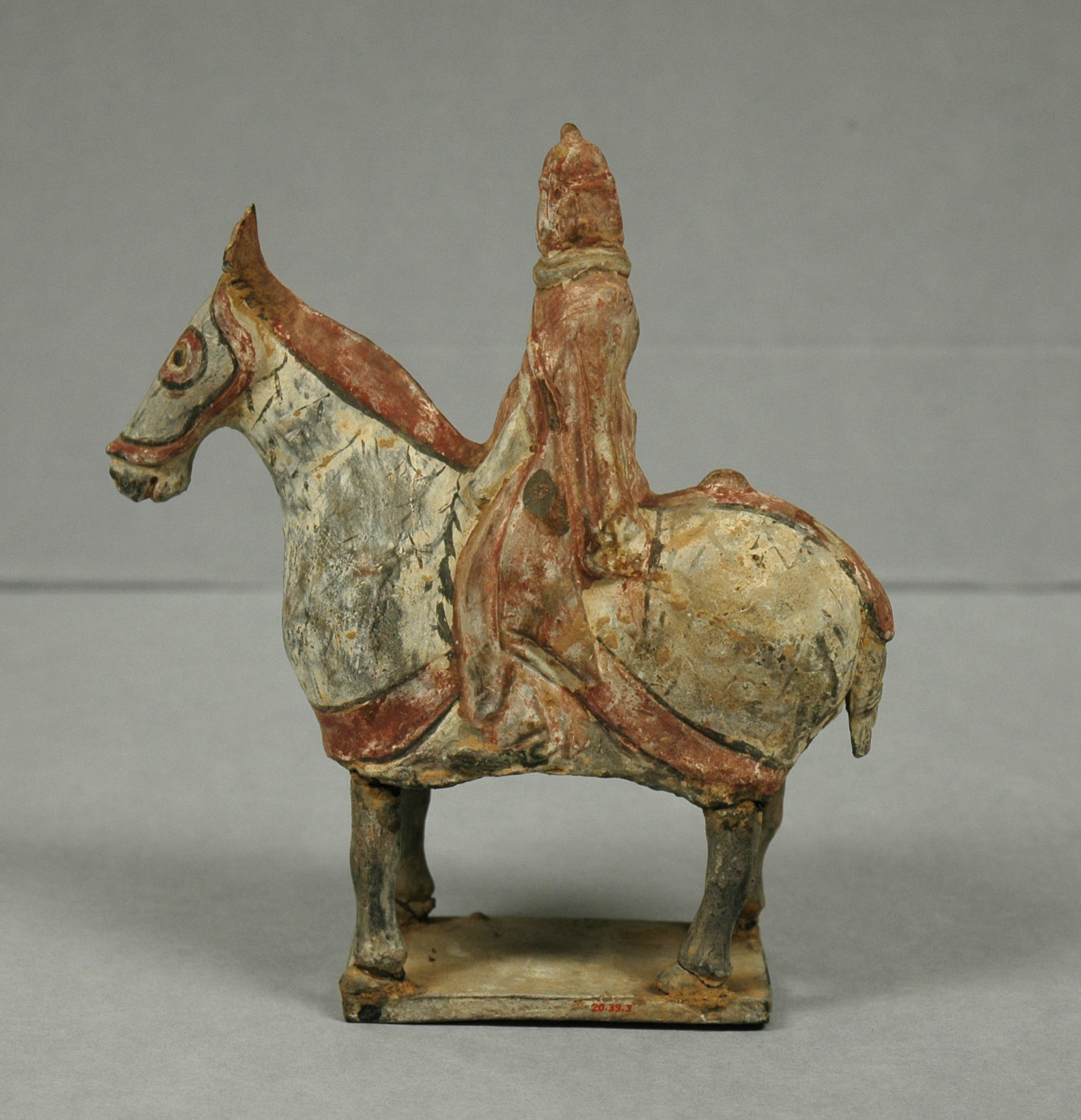
Northern Wei cavalry figurine, 6th century

==== Cultural reforms ====
In 493, three years after the death of Wenming, Emperor Xiaowen moved the capital from Pingcheng to Luoyang. The reason for the move was not just due to the Emperor's inclinations for Han culture but also economic in nature. The old capital had started its decline several decades earlier after peaking at nearly a million inhabitants in the first half of the 5th century. In 487, Pingcheng was beset with a drought and a cattle plague. In response, the government instructed its subjects to leave in search for richer fields, resulting in the departure of 50–60% of the population for the south. In comparison to Pingcheng, Luoyang was situated at the center of Northern Wei's territories connected to a network of waterways convenient for transportation.

From his new capital, Xiaowen contacted various poets and statesmen in the Southern Qi empire. According to the Book of Qi, Xiaowen "deeply valued the men of Qi" and said to his officials that "there are so many good officials down in the land south of the Yangtze". He abolished most parts of the Inner Court, which was criticized by southerners as an amalgamation of barbarian and Chinese customs, and unified the government offices in a system of Han-style official titles and ranks. Many languages, not just the Xianbei language, were spoken in court. In 495, Xiaowen banned the use of various northern languages as well as the national language in the court of Luoyang. He ordered his courtiers to only speak Chinese in court and to wear Chinese robes rather than the "barbarian garb" (cap, hood, and trousers).

Not everyone was expected to follow the cultural reforms. An allowance was made for those over the age of 30 for whom "habits had already long entrenched". Chinese had become the dominant language spoken by most important figures at court such as Xiaowen and his immediate family but it was still not widely spoken by most of the Tuoba Xianbei. An effort was made to teach them Chinese through translation of texts into their language, but this does not seem to have been particularly successful. Xiaowen complained that "Northerners (bei ren) are always saying 'why do northerners need to know books?' When we hear this, we are deeply disappointed". In a conversation with the Prince of Rencheng in 499 upon returning from a campaign, Xiaowen complained that there were still women who wore Xianbei clothing in his capital. The reception to these changes was not uniform even among his Inner Asian followers. Some of them liked it while others did not.

In 496, the court issued a decree ordering non-Han lineages to change their surnames into Han names, including the royal family. The "Tuoba" became Yuan ("the Paramount"). Such names (Zhangsun, Lu, etc.) were used anachronistically for names prior to the name change in the Book of Wei. The son of Lu Li, who married a daughter of the ethnically Han Cui family of Boling, was said to have liked the name change whereas others such as Yuan Pi despised it.

==== Administrative reforms ====
The Chinese classics were instated as a permanent source of state legitimacy. Although they had been drawn on before, such as in 444 when Taiwu ordered the nobility and ministers to attend the imperial academy to study the classics, they only became a permanent fixture of the Northern Wei state from the time of Xiaowen. Xiaowen deliberately modeled his new court and state on what he imagined to be the Zhou dynasty tradition. In 491, Xiaowen reorganized his ancestral temple to conform to the Zhou model and in the next year, three palace halls were renamed using terminology taken from The Rites of Zhou, a Warring States text supposedly describing the ideal world under the Zhou. In 492, the Northern Wei officially claimed water as their Wuxing (Chinese philosophy) element, signalling that succession had passed from the Jin dynasty (266–420) to the Wei. In 494, sacrifices to Tengri in the capital's western outskirts were abolished and replaced with the Chinese Sacrifice to Heaven on an altar south of Luoyang. The title of khagan was no longer formally used although the Xianbei who could not speak Chinese continued to refer to their ruler as such. In 495 the units of measure for length and volume were standardized based on the ones used during the Han dynasty.

The impetus to imitate the Chinese antiquity continued after the end of Xiaowen's reign and reached its peak under the Western Wei (535–557) when the entire bureaucracy was reconfigured to fit the archaic nomenclature of The Rites of Zhou. Xiaowen attempted this restructuring of functions and titles in 492 and 493 but the real complexities of the government made it unworkable. A second list of offices was published in 499 and implemented by his heir, Emperor Xuanwu (r. 499–515).

In 492, Xiaowen issued an edict demoting distant kinsmen not descended from Emperor Daowu (r. 386–409), as well as princes of different lineages, to the rank of duke. Dukes were demoted to marquises and marquises demoted to earls. In 495, another edict was issued awarding certain lineages with privileged access to high office for meritorious service to the state. While Xiaowen attempted to reconstitute the non-Han kinship groups based on Han structures, the Xianbei continued to play a central role in the state and a quota was placed on the number of posts that could be held by Han officials. Under Xiaowen's sinicized bureaucracy, Han officials still only occupied about a third of government offices. However this still constituted a reduction in the general Xianbei population's ability to gain access to promotions based on their inherent status. Regular evaluation of officials was instituted and the imperial exams greatly expanded. Officials who could not speak Chinese were removed from court and salaries cut for unassigned officials who held rank but no post.

==== Military reforms ====
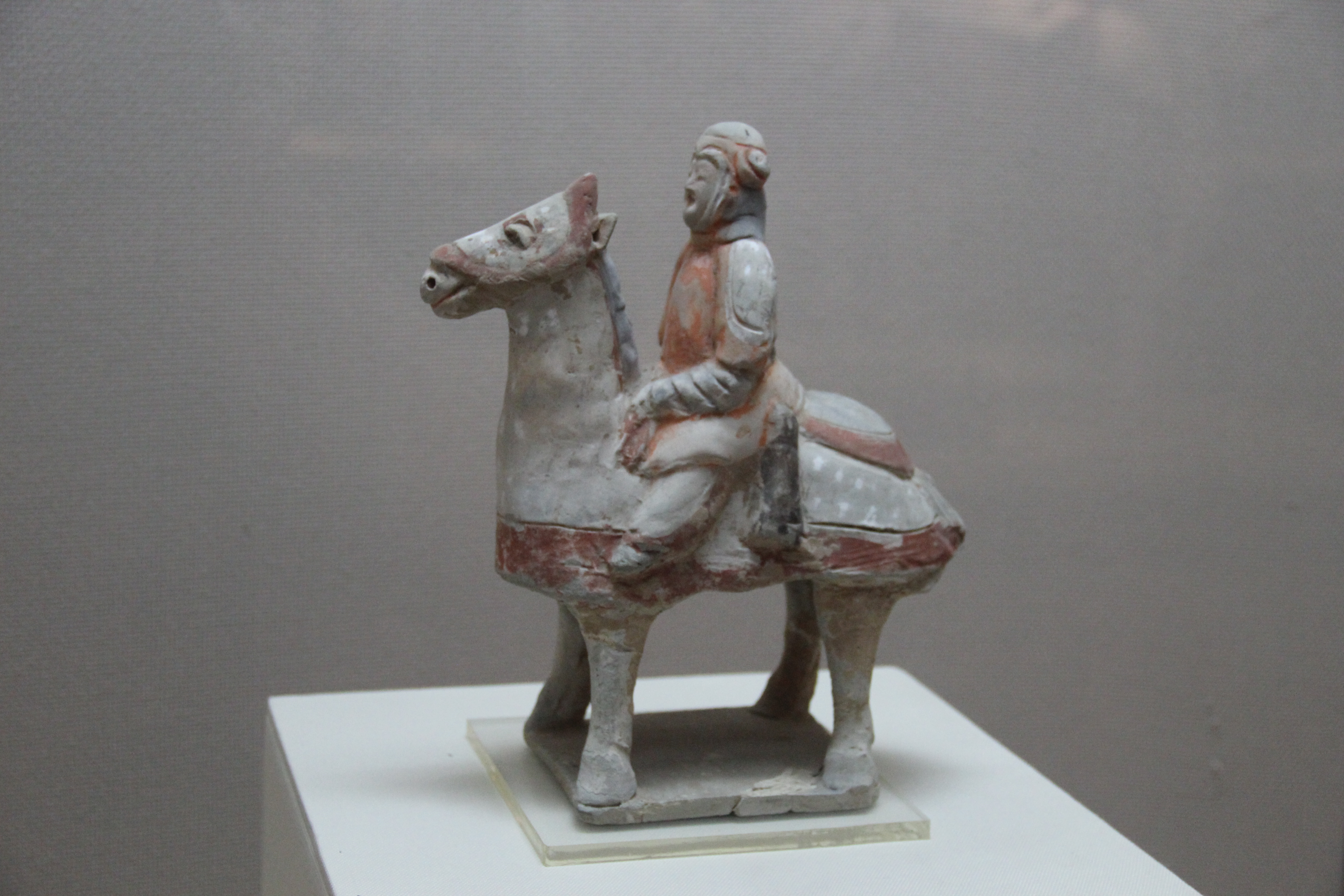
Northern dynasties horseman

The core units of the Northern Wei army were originally "those who lived in the northern territories", but this changed when Xiaowen moved a large portion of the central army to his new capital at Luoyang. Xiaowen increased the conscription of Han foot soldiers, which the implementation of the equal-field system contributed significantly to. The rearing and maintenance of warhorses in the Luoyang region was neglected. By the 520s, an army intended for the purpose of fighting other infantry had an infantry to cavalry ratio of 15 to 1. After shifting the capital to Luoyang, the lower class Xianbei were registered as "garrison households" and excluded from the formal ranking system. This was reversed in 496 with the incorporation of the lower ranks into the palace guard. Information such as regulations on the military were lost after Xiaowen's reforms. According to the Book of Wei, in the 550s the author Wei Shou observed that the "old regulations are lost; there is nothing we can depend on".

Xiaowen welcomed defectors from the south such as Wang Su, the scion of an elite family from Langye Commandery that fled south when the Western Jin collapsed. Two centuries after his family's flight south, Wang Su fled north to the Northern Wei in 494 after his family was killed by Emperor Wu of Southern Qi. Wang was installed by Xiaowen as a commander in the southern border region of Runan in what is now Henan province. He was permitted to raise a personal retinue from the local population and was attributed with reforming the government in the image of a Chinese empire. He was awarded with a pipe and drum unit and married a Wei princess under the reign of Emperor Xuanwu.

The imperial hunt, already a waning activity among the Northern Wei court by Xiaowen's time, was permanently ended by the Emperor on moral grounds.

==== Resistance to reforms ====
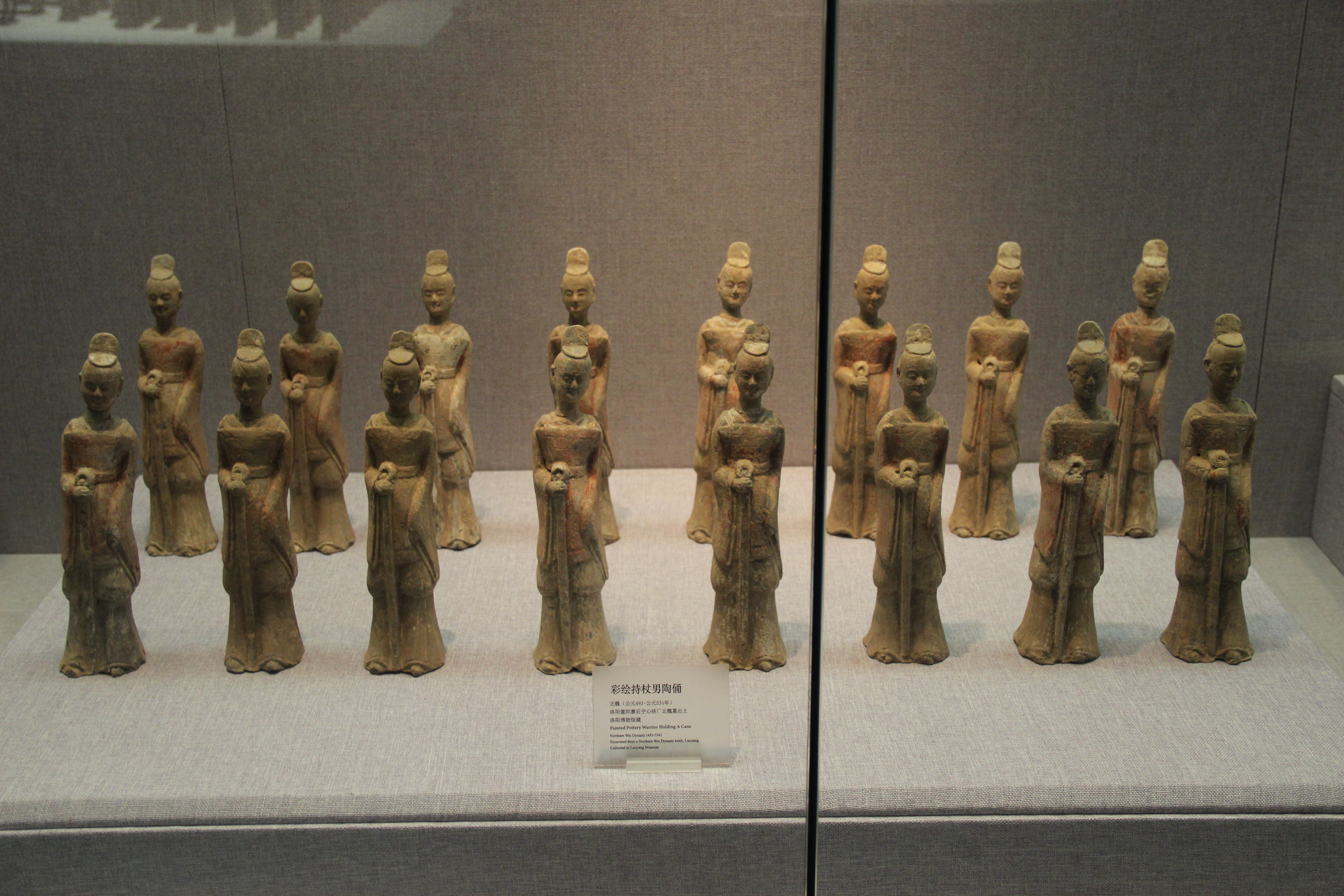
Northern Wei pottery warriors

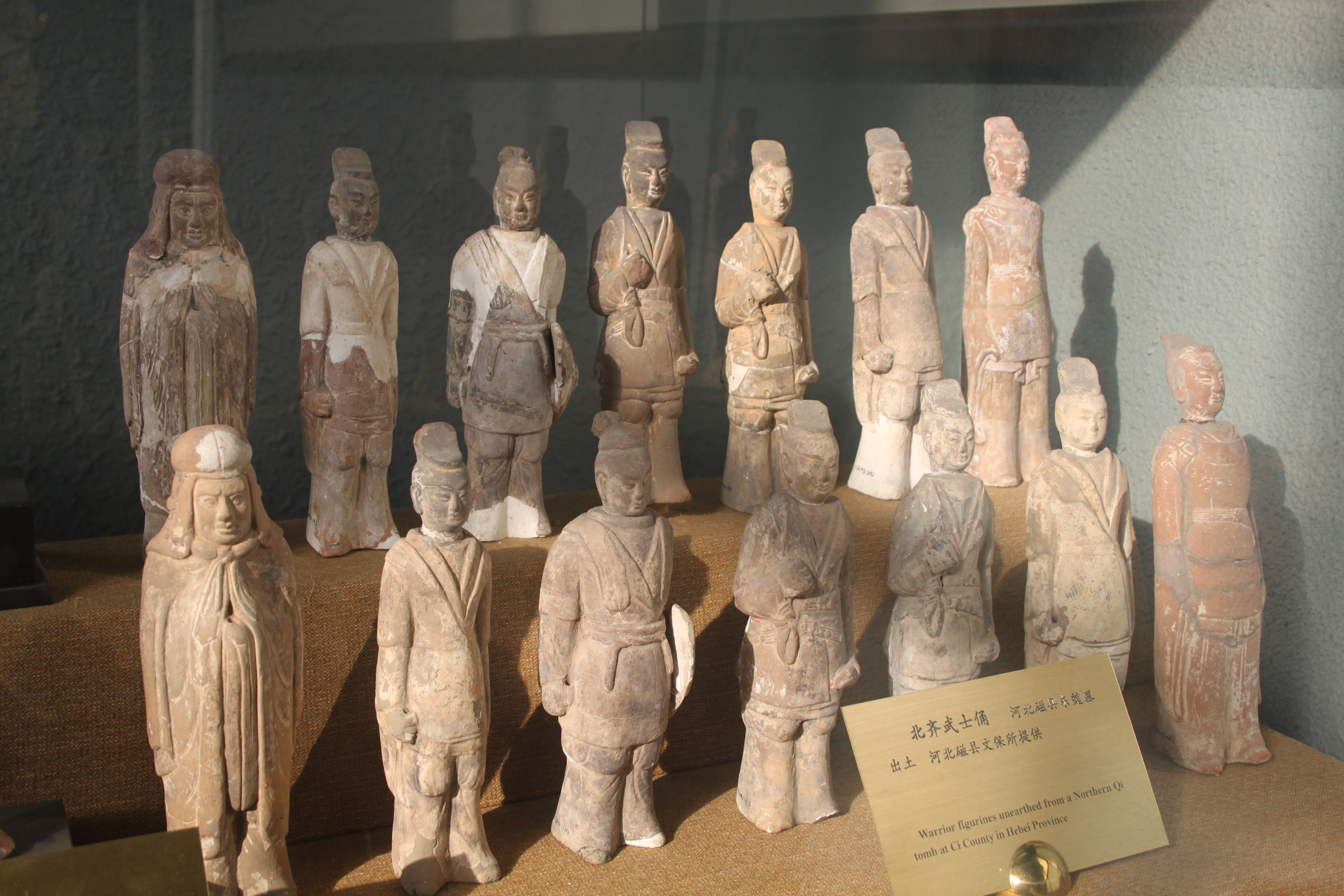
Northern Qi pottery warriors

The changes to the military and a perceived preference for literati officials caused widespread discontent in the northern Dai region in 494. In 519, a proposal to exclude military men from the highest offices provoked a violent riot in the palace guard.

Emperor Xiaowen's son, Yuan Xun, did not take well to his father's reformist outlook. Yuan Xun was raised to the status of heir apparent at the age of ten in 493. His mother had been ordered to commit suicide under his father's watch and the boy grew up troubled. He became fat and disliked the hot southern weather and wished to return north to Pingcheng. He disliked books, to the dismay of his father, and preferred wearing the garbs of a cavalryman while styling his hair in a Tuoba braid. When his father presented him with a suit of Han-style clothing, he destroyed it. In 496 he attempted to flee to Pingcheng but was captured and beaten by his father and uncle more than 100 times with a club. Then he was stripped of his title, imprisoned, and forced to commit suicide.

It was possible that Yuan Xun was trying to join a rebellion at Pingcheng. Separatist feelings in the region had increased following Xiaowen's reforms. Many old families in the countryside were unhappy with the changes, especially the increase in the number of Han officials employed in the bureaucracy. Leaders such as Yuan Pi "loved the old customs, and did not understand the new ways. Changing the government posts and regulating the clothes, forbidding the old speech-he could not accept any of these". The rebels had solicited Yuan Xun's aid in the rebellion and their resentment increased after his failure to return north. Mu Tai, the governor of Henzhou province (Pingcheng), rebelled in 496. Xiaowen sent the Prince of Rencheng to quell the rebellion. When Rencheng arrived at Pingcheng, he occupied a gatehouse in one of Pingcheng's barbicans. Despite the hostility among Pingcheng's inhabitants, most of the guard units had already been moved to Luoyang, and Mu Tai did not have the manpower to resist Rencheng's forces. Mu Tai led a force of only a few hundred to attack a negotiator sent by Rencheng. Failing that, Mu Tai fled alone on a horse, but he and all the rebels were soon captured and executed. A generation later, the northern garrisons disintegrated and migrated south as well.

=== Rebellion of the Six Frontier Towns ===
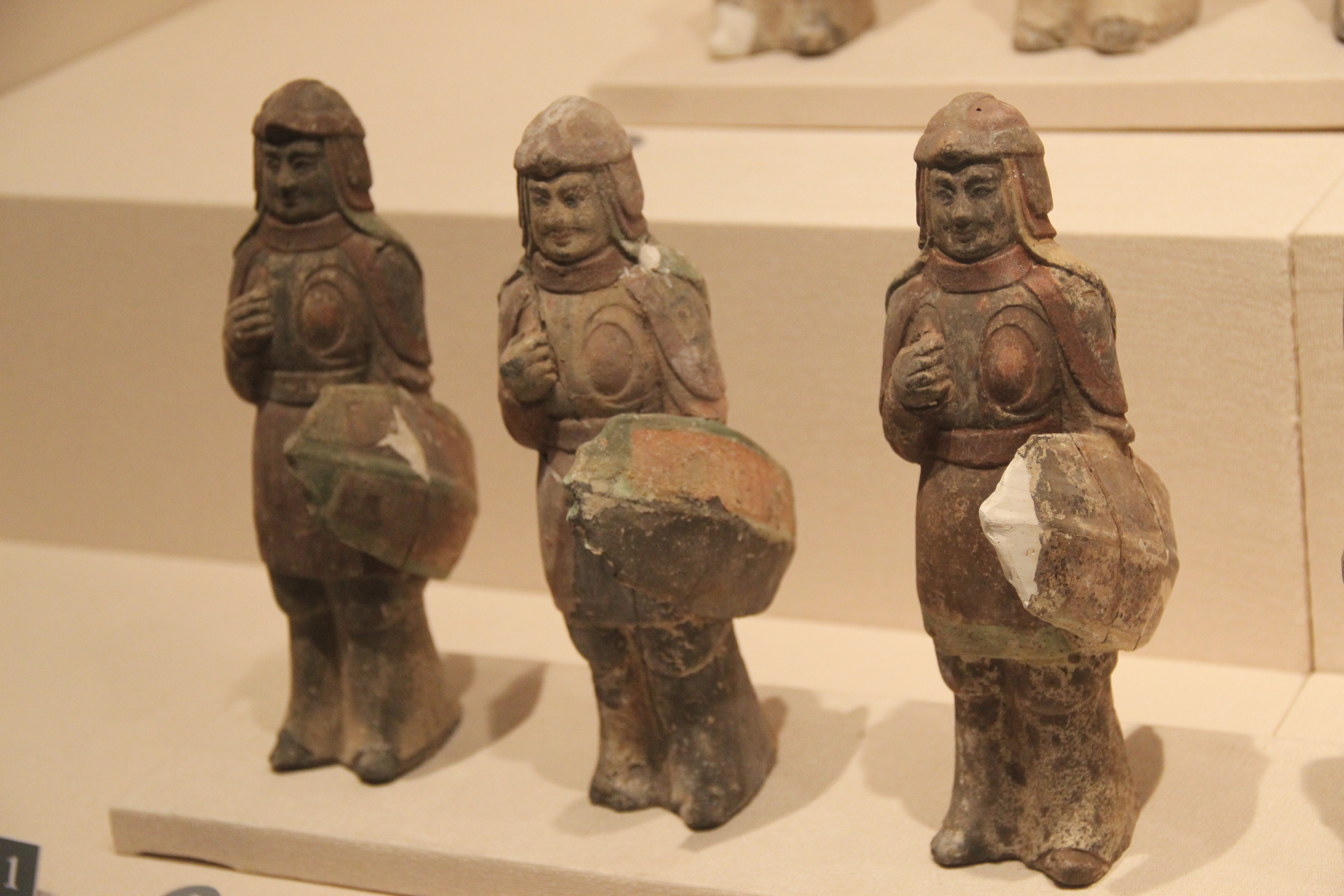
Soldier figurines from Northern Qi

In the spring of 524 a rebellion erupted among six frontier garrisons. In the summer of 523, the steppe frontier was experiencing drought and famine but the commander at Huaihuang refused to provided relief grain. The Rouran had also been raiding the frontier and an army sent from the south had been unable to stop their predations. The commander was murdered by the garrison troops and soon afterward, a Xiongnu soldier named Poliuhan Baling rebelled at Gaoque, an outpost of the Woye garrison. Most of the rebels were of Tiele and Xiongnu origins who had been allowed to retain their traditional leadership under Xianbei rule. Other rebellions sprang up around the Ordos region.

The rebellions were put down with the help of the Rouran khan in the first half of 525, but refugees fleeing from the rebellion had already moved further south and the government settled 200,000 surrendered rebels in central Hebei rather than the drought stricken frontier. By the end of the year, the displaced northerners had rebelled again. Various rebels Hebei coalesced over the next two years into a strong force under the leadership of a former Ge Rong, a former officer of the Huaishuo garrison.

A chieftain of the Qihu people (branch of the Jie people) named Erzhu Rong brought an end to the rebellion in the name of the dynasty by 528. The Erzhu clan had entered China as part of the Xiongnu Confederation and were early supporters of the Tuoba who were rewarded with lands near the Hutuo River in north-central Shanxi. By the early 6th century, they numbered 8,000 families with countless flocks of sheep, cattle, camels, and horse. Erzhu Rong and his followers absorbed refugees from the northern garrisons and expanded their forces using their immense wealth in livestock. Erzhu Rong took control of Taiyuan and in 528, he took Pingcheng on the pretext of the young Emperor Xiaoming being poisoned by the Empress Dowager Hu. On 17 May, he put to death over a thousand members of the court and the empress dowager and her three year old puppet emperor were drowned in the Yellow River.

After enthroning his own puppet emperor, Erzhu Rong confronted Ge Rong's rebels to the north of Ye and defeated the rebel forces with 7,000 picked cavalry. The defeated forces were absorbed into the Erzhu army, cementing Erzhu Rong as the strongest power in northern China. In 530, Erzhu Rong was killed by the puppet Emperor Xiaozhuang in a palace ambush. Erzhu Rong's heir and nephew, Erzhu Zhao, sacked the capital, killing Xiaozhuang, and enthroned another puppet emperor. Erzhu Zhao failed to assert authority over the empire's subjects and both his kinsmen and puppet emperor were reluctant to obey his orders. The former rebels left the capital and moved to Hebei again under the leadership of general Gao Huan.

Gao Huan was a common soldier and official in Wei who came from a Han lineage that had assimilated into Xianbei culture over three generations. He could speak both Chinese and Xianbei languages. He grew up in poverty on the frontier until he married Lou Zhaojun, the daughter of a wealthy Xianbei cattleman. He was part of the rebel group that sprang up in 523 before defecting to Erzhu Rong, who put him in charge of Ge Rong's former forces. Gao left for Hebei in 531 and won the support of large Han militia forces. In the late spring of 532, Gao's combined frontier cavalry and Han militia army defeated Erzhu Zhao's forces at Hanling Ridge. He installed his own puppet emperor on the throne. Even though Gao came from Han origins, he identified as Xianbei, and when the puppet emperor was enthroned, he revived the old Tuoba tradition of seven men carrying the ruler on a black felt and facing west to salute the end of the day.

=== Eastern and western regimes ===
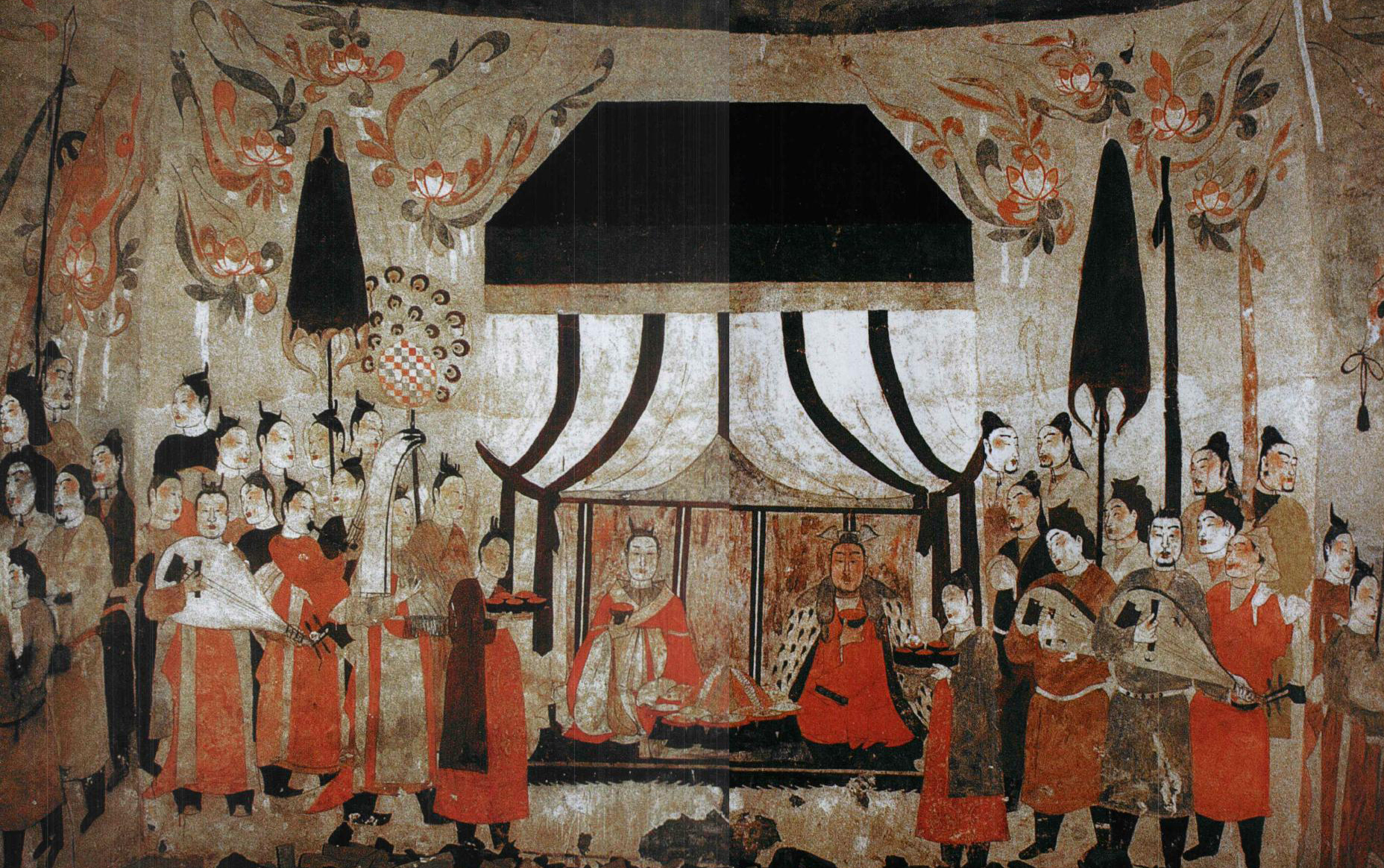
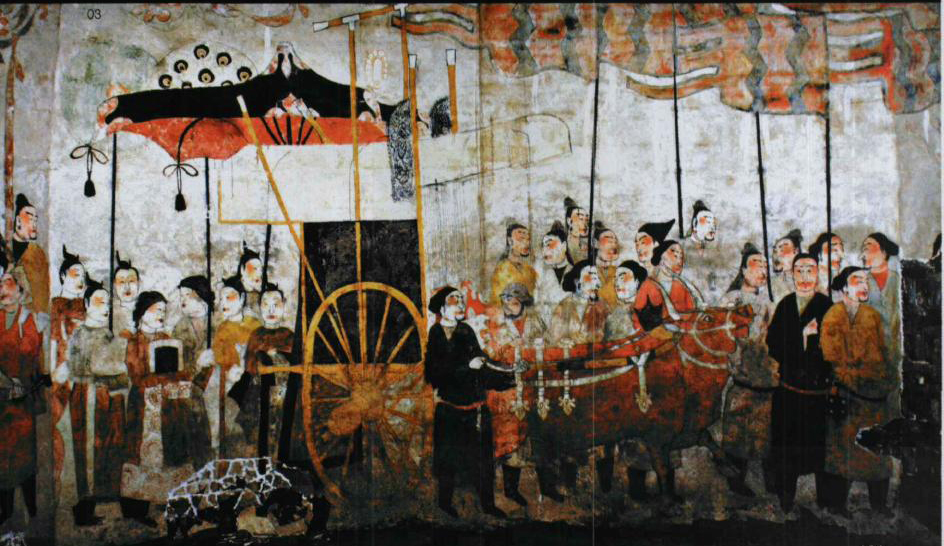
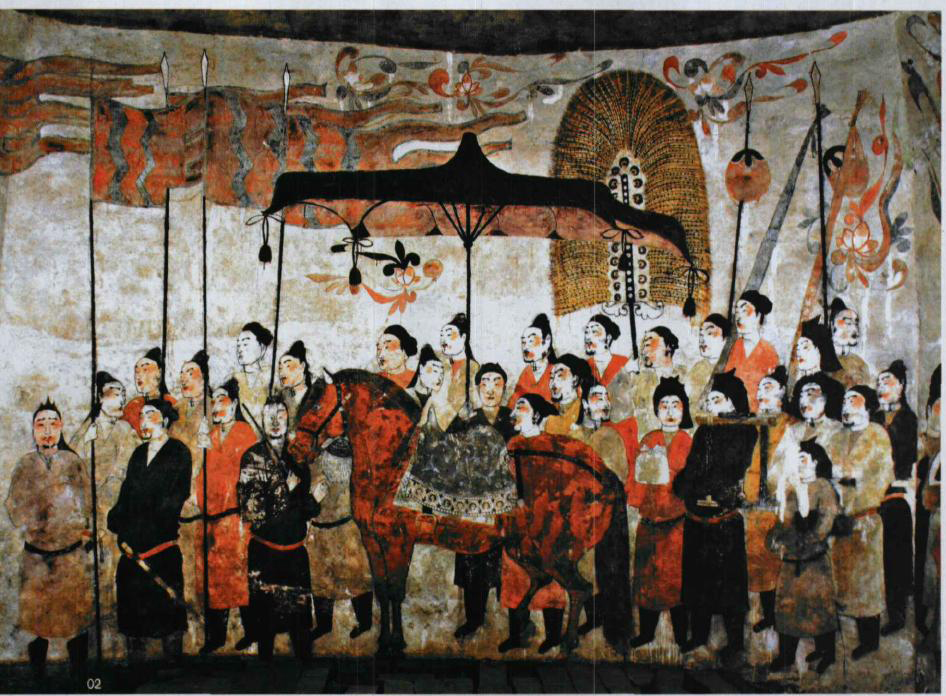
Mural paintings of court life in Xu Xianxiu's Tomb, Northern Qi dynasty, 571 AD, located in Taiyuan, Shanxi province

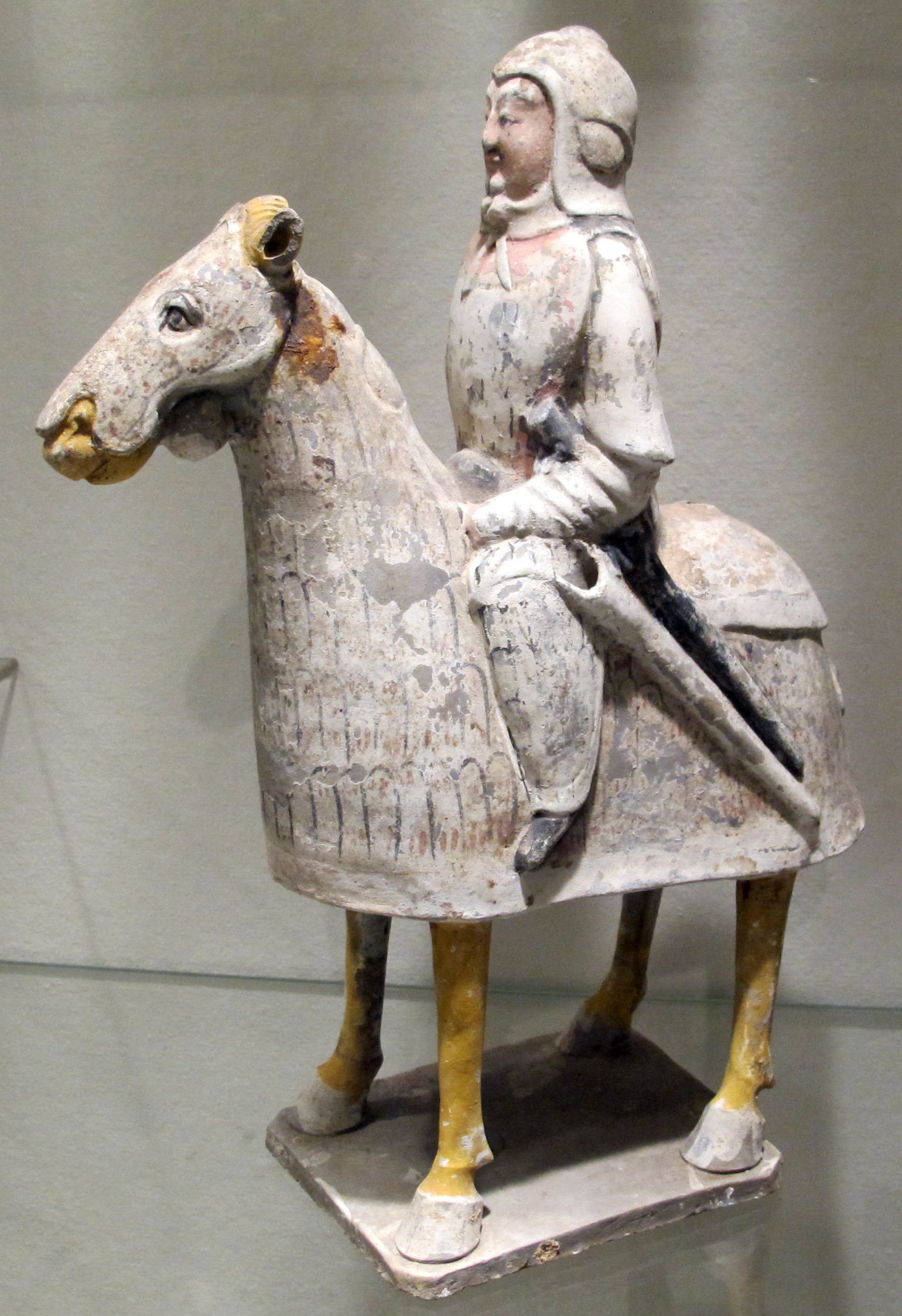
Cavalry figurine from Northern Qi

The puppet emperor under Gao Huan fled to Xi'an in 535 under the protection of the local strongman Yuwen Tai. The remaining Erzhu forces had coalesced around Yuwen Tai who hailed from the Wuchuan garrison. The Yuwen clan were originally a Xiongnu group who were given "compatriot" status under the Wei. Yuwen Tai and his father organized a loyalist militia during the rebel uprising of 523 but eventually defected to the rebels in Hebei. After his father was killed in battle, Yuwen Tai entered the service of Ge Rong and Erzhu Rong. In the army, he found a friend of his father, Heba Yue, as a leader under the Erzhu. When Heba Yue was murdered in 534, the senior officers chose Yuwen Tai as their new leader.

Gao Huan established a new emperor and forced the entire population of Luoyang to relocate to his new capital at Ye in what is now Linzhang County. This division of Northern Wei came to be known as the Eastern Wei (534–550) and Western Wei (535–556) regimes. In 550, Gao Huan's descendants usurped the Eastern Wei throne and founded Northern Qi (550–577) while Yuwen Tai's descendants usurped the Western Wei throne in 557 and founded the Northern Zhou (557–581).

Gao Huan attacked Western Wei in Guanzhong in early 537. The attack was defeated by a cavalry force of 6,000 led by Yuwen Tai. Another invasion by Eastern Wei was attempted in the fall with more than 100,000 men. The invading force was defeated on 19 November when they charged the numerically smaller defending force of 7,000 on the bank of the Wei River. A contingent of heavy cavalry hidden in the tall reeds growing by the riverbank charged into the western wing of the Western Wei army and routed them. Gao Huan reportedly lost more than 75% of the army. Western Wei tried to follow up their victory by advancing on Luoyang but suffered a defeat at the Yellow River and was forced to retreat on 13 September, 538. Next, Gao Huan attempted to take the fortress of Yubi in the fall of 542. After nine days and nights of uninterrupted fighting, Gao Huan was forced to retreat due to a snowstorm. Yuwen Tai tried to take Luoyang again in 543 with no success after several days of fighting ended in defeat. In 546, Gao Huan laid siege to Yubi again, which lasted for 50 days. The besiegers tried all sorts of methods to penetrate the fortress, including building an earthen mound, tunneling, and using a battering ram. Eventually they succeeded in causing a small section of the wall to collapse by mining but the defenders filled up the gap with a makeshift palisade. After losing several thousand men, Gao Huan withdrew to Taiyuan and died a few weeks later.

The Eastern Wei regime absorbed the greater portion of the Xianbei military class and preferred to deploy them over Han soldiers. The Western regime however lacked the manpower to forego Han recruits and made significant use of them in their campaigns. The utilization of Han troops eventually led to the triumph of the Western Wei's successor regime, Northern Zhou, over the Eastern Wei's successor, Northern Qi. Despite having the larger population base, the eastern Xianbei elite hailed from the northern garrisons which opposed sinicizing policies at the capital. They treated the Han with disdain and distrust, refusing to incorporate them into their military structure. The Han population reciprocated this sentiment and did little to help their overlords in times of need. In the west, the Xianbei had no choice but to rely upon not just the Han, but also the Qiang, for they lacked the numbers to stand up to their eastern counterpart. The result was a new hybridized northwestern aristocracy of Xianbei, Han, and Qiang descent that gave birth to the Sui and Tang dynasties.

While Eastern Wei and its successor Northern Qi reasserted Xianbei dominance to a greater degree than Western Wei and Northern Zhou, Xianbei customs and language throughout the north experienced a revival in the 6th century. Or rather, the sinicizing reforms of Emperor Xiaowen never took off anywhere other than the immediate royal court at Luoyang, and the revival of Xianbei customs throughout the north merely represented common Xianbei practices elsewhere. In 549, the Western Wei ordered people who had taken Han Chinese names to revert back to their old Xianbei surnames and bestowed Xianbei surnames upon the Han elites. Discrimination against the Han was commonplace and Han people were used as fodder in cavalry battles between the two regimes, driven before the two sides as human shields. However it is uncertain if Han in this context always meant ethnically Han Chinese people. In 571, an unsuccessful coup attempt resulted in the death of a court figure named He Shikai in Northern Qi. A general attempted to placate the emperor, saying that He Shikai was merely a Han person and therefore unworthy of being mourned. However the dynastic history describes He Shikai's family origins as a non-Han merchant hailing from the Western Regions. Individuals of Han descent could also labelled as non-Han simply for being from certain areas. This was the case with the Han scholar Xu Zunming (475-52), who was labelled as a Qiang person because he was from the Shaanxi region.

Despite the reassertion of Xianbei identity, the line between Xianbei and Han continued to blur. In 536, Gao Huan sent his oldest child, Cheng (d. 549), to govern the imperial capital at Ye. Gao Cheng built a following around himself consisting of mostly Han literati. A defector of non-Han descent later described Gao Cheng as a mere "Xianbei child". Gao Cheng was assassinated in 549 and his brother Yang succeeded him. Gao Yang (Emperor Wenxuan of Northern Qi) usurped the Eastern Wei throne and founded Northern Qi. Despite Gao Huan's policy of separating the Han and Xianbei into discrete classes defined by their occupation, he married his children to prominent Han families. Gao Yang departed from previously established norms and disregarded his advisors' opposition to making his Han wife, Li Zu'e, the formal empress. He was known to befriend Han people and chose certain Han men of exceptional bravery for military service, an occupation formerly reserved for the Xianbei.

After Gao Yang died in 559, the Northern Qi became embroiled in infighting between different factions that has been attributed to conflict between civilian and military sectors or Han and Xianbei groups by different scholars. Possibly out of fear of the Han seizing power, Empress Dowager Lou Zhaojun ordered for her daughter-in-law, Empress Li, and her grandson, Gao Yin, to be removed from power. Within four months, a number of Han officials were executed and Gao Yin was overthrown by one of Gao Yang's brothers, who then became a puppet emperor while real power was wielded by the military class.

Continuing friction between factions in the east weakened the Northern Qi. From 573 to 575, Northern Qi suffered military defeats against the southern Chen dynasty and lost a large portion of its territory north of the Yangtze, leading to its conquest by the western regime's Han-Xianbei army in 577. The choice to incorporate larger numbers of Han recruits into the army did not happen willingly or immediately in the west. After suffering a significant defeat in 543, Western Wei began recruiting local militias commanded by Han strongmen. In 550, civilians considered capable of fighting were organized into garrison militias (fubing). In preparation for a final battle with the eastern regime, in 573 Northern Zhou eliminated household registrations for civilians and recruited them into the military. It was said that half the Han people became soldiers. At the same time, Yuwen Tai and his successors promoted Confucianism as a civilizing force against the "rude customs of the Xianbei". Emperor Wu of Northern Zhou (r. 561-578) favored Confucianism and launched a purge of Buddhism in 574 on the grounds that Buddhism was foreign to China.

=== Fall of Northern Qi ===
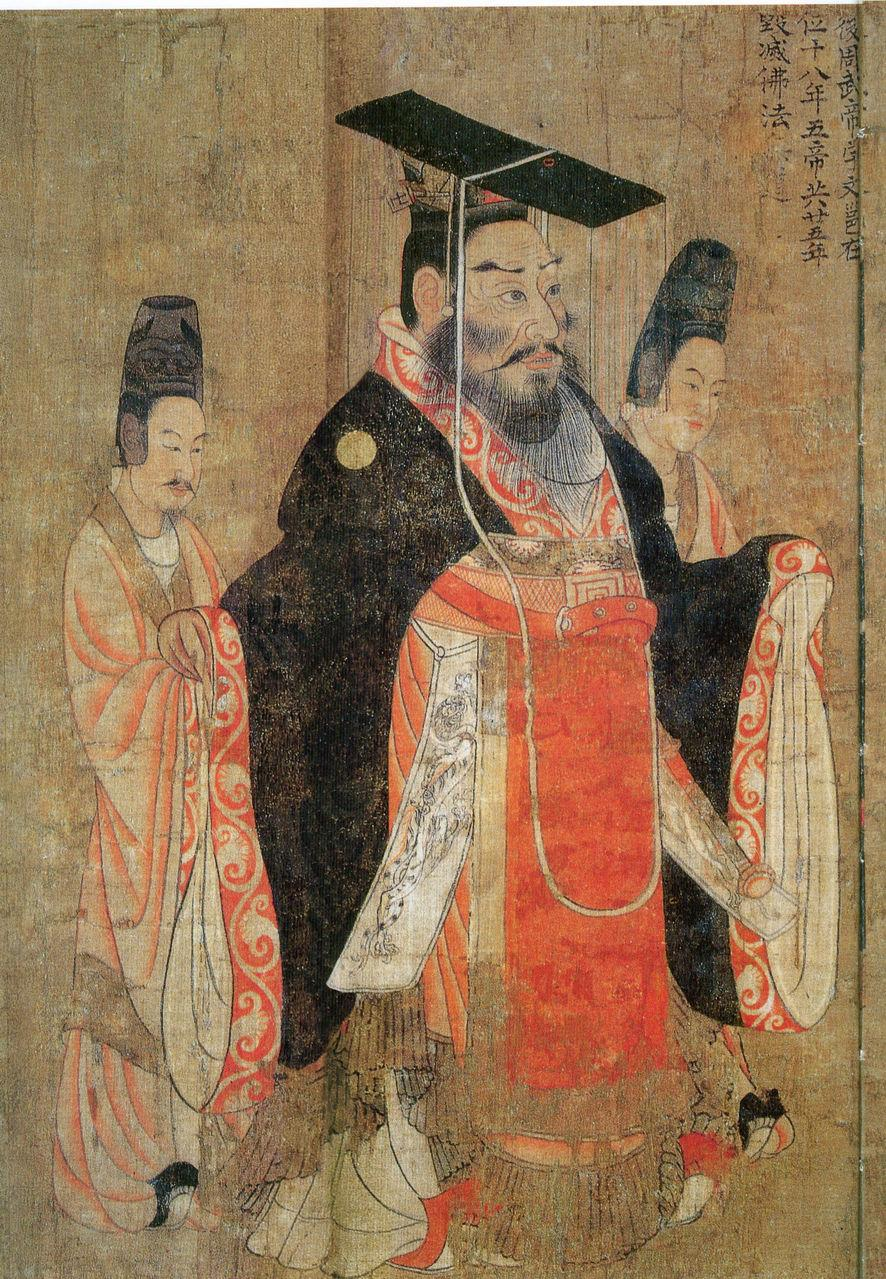
Tang dynasty portrait of Emperor Wu of Northern Zhou by Yan Liben (600–673)

In 572, Emperor Wu of Northern Zhou took direct control of the imperial army and in the summer of 575, he mobilized 170,000 men for an offensive on Luoyang. After some initial successes, the expedition failed to take the Jinyong Fortress and the Emperor fell ill, forcing them to retreat after 18 days of campaigning.

From 573 to 575, the Northern Qi lost a large portion of its territory to military advances by the Chen dynasty.

In the fall of 576, Emperor Wu decided to directly attack Northern Qi's military headquarters at Taiyuan. On 10 November 576, Emperor Wu personally led the main army to lay siege on Pingyang (modern Linfen) with 60,000 troops while another 85,000 men advanced further north to guard against a possible relief effort. Pingyang fell in early December. After garrisoning the city with 10,000 men, the Zhou army withdrew to the fortress of Yubi while the Qi ruler, Gao Wei, led a large army from Taiyuan to lay siege to Pingyang. The Zhou army returned to relieve Pingyang from the siege but they were unable to engage the Qi army due to a protective ditch they had dug south of Pingyang. However, eunuchs in Gao Wei's entourage convinced him that it was shameful for an emperor to hide behind a ditch. Gao Wei had the ditch filled and crossed the obstacle to attack the Zhou army. The Qi left wing was defeated, causing Gao Wei to flee the battle, demoralizing his soldiers and causing the entire Qi army to collapse.

The Zhou vanguard reached Taiyuan on 17 January 577 and on 20 January, 40,000 Qi warriors sallied out to offer battle but were driven back. Emperor Wu led a small cavalry force to take the eastern walls of the city. A counterattack by Qi forces in the night forced him to retreat. On 21 January, the entire Zhou army attacked the east gate and captured the city. With the fall of Taiyuan, the headquarter of the Qi army, the Zhou forces were free to sweep across east. The capital of Northern Qi, Ye, fell on 22 February. Gao Wei had fled to Shandong where he was captured and put to death by the end of the year, ending the Northern Qi dynasty.

=== Han-Xianbei intermarriage ===
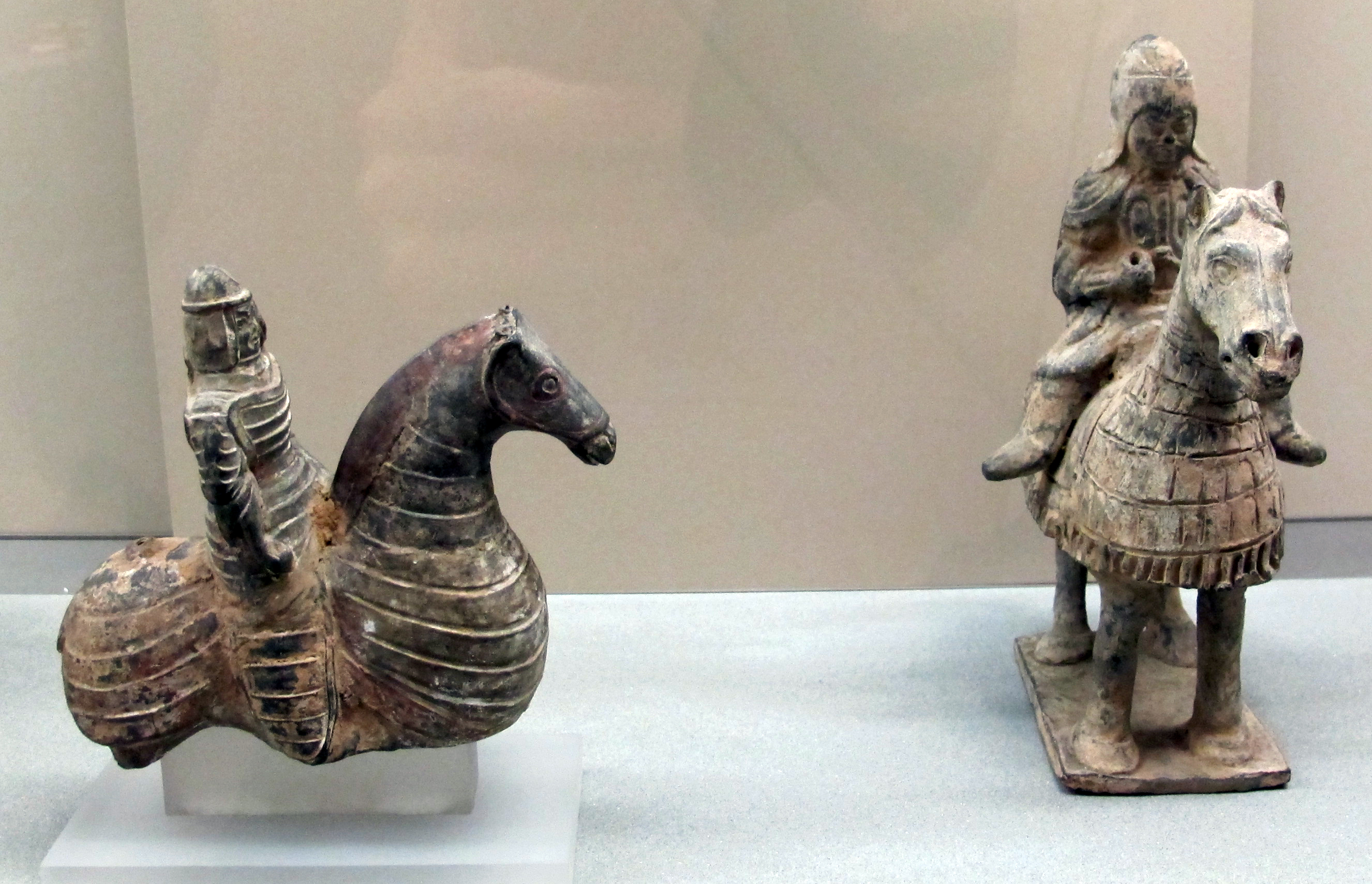
Armored horsemen figurines, Northern Wei

In the 480s, the Northern Wei started promoting marriages between women from the Tuoba royal family and elite Han men in the provinces to integrate their wealth into the state-controlled political and economic structure. Of the 50 recorded Northern Wei princesses, around half married southern Han Chinese men. Among these men, half were from aristocratic or royal families from the Southern dynasties who defected and moved north to join the Northern Wei. Several daughters of Emperor Xiaowen were married to Han elites. The Liu Song royal Liu Hui married Princess Lanling, Princess Huayang was married to Sima Fei, a descendant of Jin dynasty (266–420) royalty, Princess Jinan to Lu Daoqian, and Princess Nanyang to Xiao Baoyin, a member of Southern Qi royalty. Emperor Xiaozhuang's sister the Shouyang Princess was wedded to the Liang dynasty ruler Emperor Wu of Liang's son Xiao Zong.

The Northern Qi emperor Wenxuan married a Han woman, Li Zu'e. His father Gao Huan was descended from a Han lineage and married a Xianbei woman named Lou Zhaojun.

A genetic analysis of the remains of Emperor Wu of Northern Zhou (r. 560–578) confirms the presence of Yellow River ancestry (associated with Han Chinese) at ~32%. This can likely be explained by Emperor Wu's grandmother who had the surname Wang and was considered to be of Goguryeo descent, but was probably from the prominent Han Chinese Wang clan of Lelang Commandery. In comparison, the genetic analysis of Wu's wife, Empress Ashina, shows almost completely Ancient Northeast Asian ancestry with no Yellow River admixture. Genetic analysis of a single Xianbei individual from the period when Pingcheng was still the capital shows strong affinity with Chinese farming communities in the Central Plains as well as southern East Asians such as the Miao people. Another genetic analysis of an elite Xianbei-associated individual from Luoyang dating to the first half of the 6th century under Northern and Eastern Wei rule shows substantial Central Plains ancestry and groups with the Yellow River Basin gene pool. Compared with earlier Xianbei-related individuals, this individual shares more alleles with Central Plains populations. The specimen was found in an elite Xianbei-associated tomb, however it is unknown if the individual came from a Xianbei background or was a local who was incorporated into a Xianbei social group. The tomb was constructed after Xiaowen's relocation to Luoyang and shows integration of Han and Xianbei cultures.

=== Sui-Tang dynasties ===
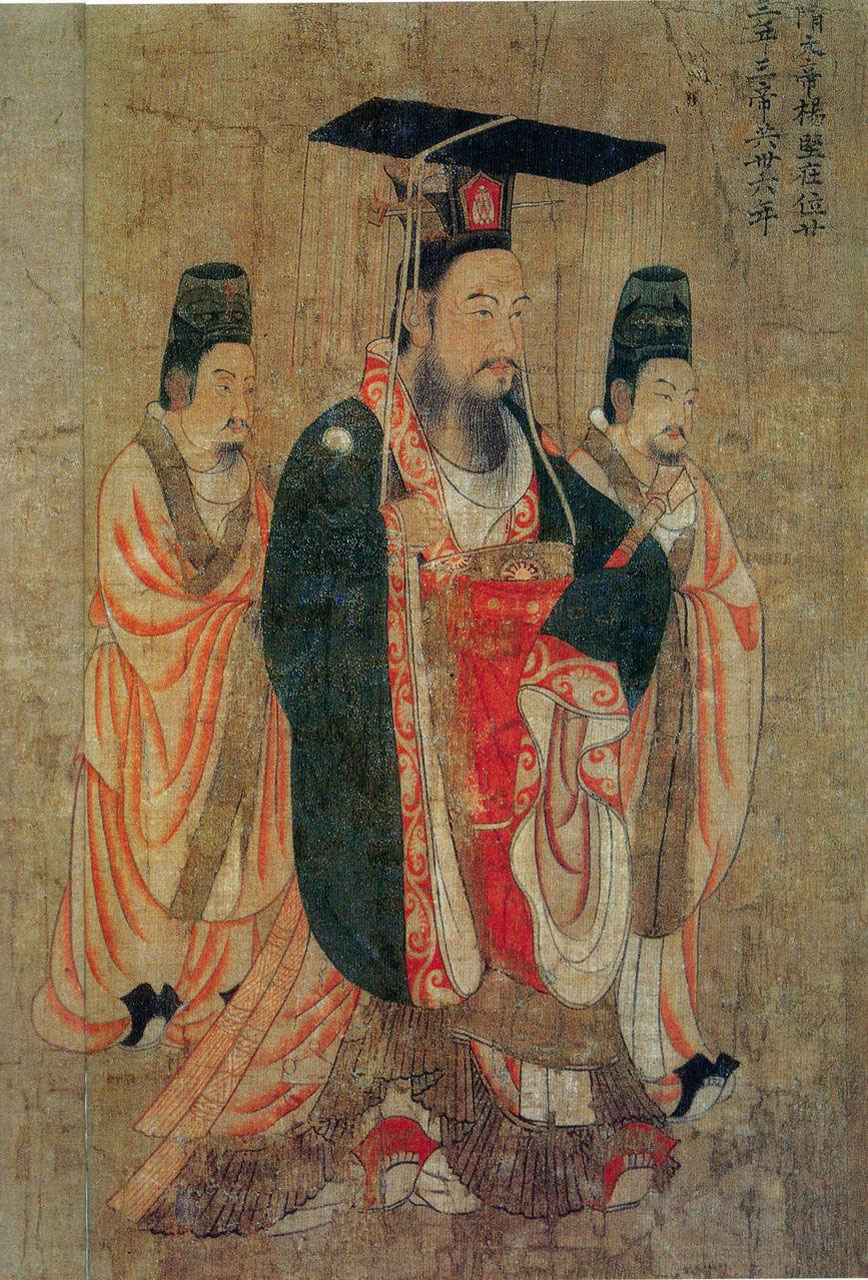
Emperor Wen of Sui (r. 581–604), first emperor of the Sui dynasty (581–618), by Yan Liben (c. 600–673)

The Xianbei continued to serve as soldiers during the mid-6th century and descendants of Northern Wei's royal family survived into the Tang dynasty. Those among them include the chancellor Zhangsun Wuji (d. 659) and poet statesman Yuan Zhen (779–831). In the 8th century Turkic Orkhon inscriptions, the Tang dynasty and China are referred to as Tabγač (Tuoba) according to the Old Turkic pronunciation. It is usually anglicized as Tabgach or Tabgatch. Although both the Sui and Tang dynasties entrenched themselves in Chinese terms, the groundwork for their governments and armies was based on institutions created in the preceding northern Xianbei dynasties.

Both the royal families of the Sui and Tang dynasties originated from ethnically mixed Han-Xianbei lineages. By the end of the Northern Zhou dynasty, a new northwestern aristocracy of mixed Han-Xianbei-Qiang descent had formed in Guanzhong. This hybrid aristocracy combined Chinese cultural elements with the values and customs of the Xianbei garrison elite, forming a group that were not just versed in Confucian classics, but also horsemanship and archery. According to James Watt, due to the mixed nature of the Northern Zhou elites, individuals with the surname Li were not wholly Han but those with the surname Dugu (a Xianbei name) were not necessarily wholly Xianbei either.

The first emperor of the Sui dynasty, Yang Jian (Emperor Wen of Sui), was a general of the last Xianbei dynasty in China, the Northern Zhou. In 581, Yang Jian forced his grandson, the last emperor of Northern Zhou, to abdicate before he established himself as emperor of the Sui. Despite his Xianbei heritage, once Yang Jian was in power, he made a point of emphasizing his Han cultural identity by promoting Han surnames, banning "barbarian" music, and building a bureaucracy based on the Qin and Han dynasties. The capital of Chang'an was built on a Han dynasty template. He limited the power of the elite families by reassigning land using the Equal-field system and consolidated power over the northwestern aristocracy and the central government.

The first Tang emperor, Li Yuan (Emperor Gaozu of Tang), was related to both the Sui and Northern Zhou royal houses. He was a cousin of Emperor Yang of Sui and his mother was the sister of three Northern Zhou emperors. These powerful ties gave him the positions that led to his ascendance as emperor. Under the Sui dynasty, Li Yuan held several prefectural appointments in modern Shaanxi and Anhui. He then became the commander of two prefectures in Henan and Shanxi before taking the position of military officer at the palace in Chang'an. He served as an overseer of logistics in the Goguryeo–Sui War and as a commander-in-chief in anti-rebel suppression campaigns before becoming Garrison Commander in Taiyuan.

The second Tang emperor, Li Shimin (Emperor Taizong of Tang), had 5th and 6th generation ancestors who were both generals in Northern Wei (Li Xi and Li Tianci). His great grandfather, Li Hu, was a military commander who worked with Yuwen Tai to establish Western Wei and was honored as one of the bazhuguo (Eight Pillars of State). When Yuwen Tai's son became emperor of Northern Zhou, Li Hu was given the posthumous title "Duke of Tang", which passed onto his descendants. Both of Li Shimin's grandmothers were from aristocratic Xianbei lineages. His paternal grandmother, Li Bing's wife, was a daughter of the Xianbei-ized Xiongnu general Dugu Xin (another one of the Eight Pillars). Two other daughters of Dugu Xin married the second emperor of Northern Zhou and the first Sui emperor, making Li Yuan the nephew of both royal houses as well as a cousin to the second Sui emperor.

The early wives and empresses of the Sui and Tang dynasties were also Xianbei, such Yang Jian's wife, Dugu Qieluo, Li Yuan's wife, Duchess Dou and Li Shimin's wife, Empress Zhangsun. Li Shimin married Empress Zhangsun (601–636) when they were 17 and 13 years old respectively. She was the daughter of Zhangsun Sheng (551–609), a descendant of the third brother of Emperor Xianwen of Northern Wei, who served as a general in the Sui dynasty.

=== Assimilation ===
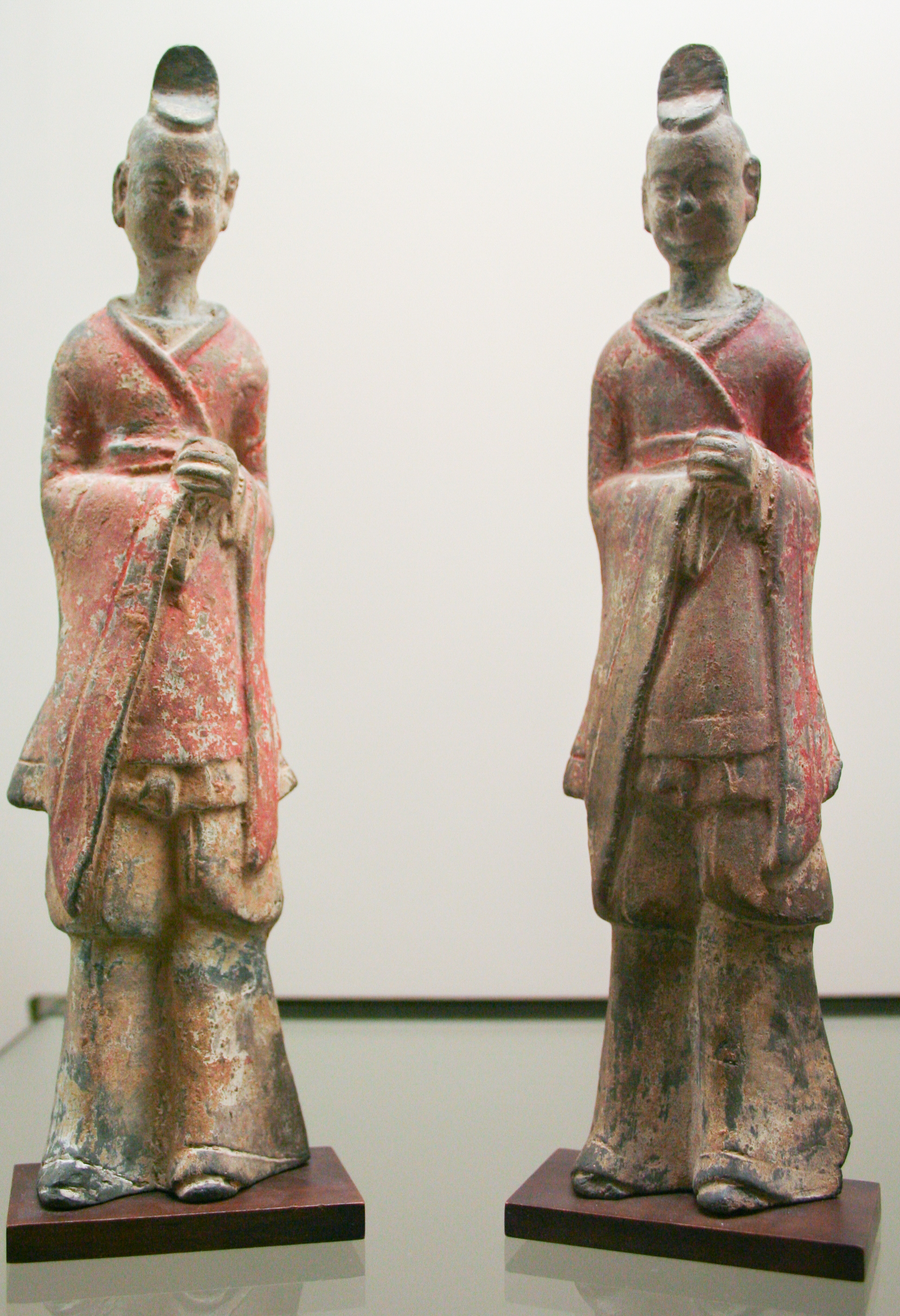
Two officials, Northern dynasties, 6th century

By the time Emperor Xiaowen decreed that the court should only speak Chinese in 495, the Chinese language had probably already become an important court language because it would have been impossible to switch on such short notice. Many of their subjects spoke Chinese and nearly all documents were written in Chinese. However, the Xianbei language did not immediately disappear after the ban on non-Chinese languages. Northern Wei's successor states and their rulers reasserted Xianbei identity and reverted their names back to the old Xianbei names and even bestowed Xianbei names on their subjects. The Northern Zhou emperors were still speaking in the Xianbei language to their officials as of 577. The Sui-Tang imperial families, being descended from Xianbei elites, probably also spoke the Xianbei language. However, even before Yang Jian (Emperor Wen of Sui) formally usurped the Northern Zhou throne, he had already ordered for those who had been given Xianbei names to revert to their Han names. The Sui-Tang dynasties supported linguistic uniformity and saw deviance from the established imperial language as a problem. Tang elites privileged a form of spoken Chinese based on a 6th century Luoyang dialect. According to the Book of Sui, completed in 636, the Xianbei people of the Central Plains had become so Chinese that many of them no longer understood the Xianbei language. In the early 8th century, a member of the Zhangsun clan played a tune likely dating back to the Northern Wei period in their original language, but the words could not be understood. The Tongdian, finished in 801, records that of 53 Xianbei songs, only 6 could still be understood.

In addition to reverting to Han Chinese names, the Sui-Tang dynasties also removed military institutions that were tied to Xianbei identity. In 590, Emperor Wen decreed that most soldiers should retire and become regular farmers, doing away with the hereditary military class that made the Xianbei distinct from the Han. The Xianbei-style heavy cavalry that was so prevalent in previous centuries became less prominent as the early Tang shifted away from heavily armored warhorses to Turkic-style light cavalry. The majority of the early Tang army was composed of semi-professional fubing levies led by northern military families of mixed descent who nonetheless largely identified with China and the mainstream ethnicity. As the fubing system declined in the 8th century, frontier officers were staffed by Han people of lowly backgrounds or non-Han of steppe origin.

Material conditions between the Han and Xianbei seen in burial culture were indistinguishable even before the Sui-Tang dynasties. By the 5th century, tombs in the Pingcheng region under Tuoba rule do not seem have exhibited especially unique designs that set them apart from other Chinese tombs and there was a general reversion to the burial culture of the Western Jin dynasty. An elite Xianbei-associated tomb in Luoyang from the first half of the 6th century under Northern and Eastern Wei rule show a combination of Han and Xianbei cultural practices. The stone funerary bed on which the tomb owner's body was placed is a Han-Xianbei innovation dating to the mid-5th century. The spacial arrangement and imagery around the funerary bed featuring scenes from "The Twenty-Four Filial Exemplars" shows that the individual was under court-centric Han influence. With the exception of a ceramic vessel that can be identified as Xianbei, the majority of grave goods consisting of over 40 objects follow Central Plains traditions. The Xianbei ceramic vessel is shaped like a bowl at the mouth and is attached to a globular body by an elongated slender neck. It can be found as a common item in several Xianbei living sites and tombs in Inner Mongolia. It is unknown whether the owner of the tomb was a Xianbei person or a local who was integrated into a Xianbei social group. Based on studies of tombs in the Eastern Wei's successor, Northern Qi (550–577), James Watt concluded that "there is no discernable difference in the tombs of the Xianbei aristocracy and that of the Han families".

Descendants of the Xianbei aristocracy continued to play a leading role in the Tang dynasty. As late as the mid-8th century, knowledge of their Xianbei origin was still widespread. But this did not mean acceptance or promotion of Xianbei identity. The Xianbei ethnonym is absent from Sui-Tang sources and by this time it had become "bad form to refer explicitly to these families' Inner Asian origins". According to Shao-yun Yang, the ethnic dichotomy between Xianbei and Han had ceased to exist by the Tang dynasty and all its subjects were referred to as "Han" while Jonathan Karam Skaff states that the Tang "never encouraged ethnicity as a basis of loyalty". Marc S. Abramson on the other hand argues that the Tang state was aware of ethnic differences and promoted Chinese culture among non-Han people. This did not mean that all ethnic differences disappeared, and Yang suggests that they lasted longer than the texts might imply, but a discrete separation between Han and Xianbei no longer existed. Xianbei cultural influences became part of the mainstream. According to Charles Holcombe, the Xianbei influenced the long term Chinese adoption of originally non-Chinese elements such as tunics, trousers, and boots for men. The increasing uptake of Buddhism during the Sui dynasty was also originally due to non-Chinese influence.

While the Xianbei people living in the Central Plains merged with the Han population, the Xianbei who remained behind in the northern grassland evolved into or were absorbed by tribes of the Rouran Khaganate and Khitan people. However, the Khitans were noticeably different from the Xianbei, at which point the Xianbei identity disappeared completely.

=== Legacy ===
In the 8th century, Turkic inscriptions used the word "Tabgatch" to refer to the Tang dynasty. This word is commonly believed to be derived from "Tuoba", serving as an attestation to the dominance of the Xianbei in northern China and their impact throughout history despite the disappearance of the Xianbei identity. The name "Tuoba" and its Turkic pronunciation as "Tabghach" became a generic Central Asian word for "China". Due to the Tang dynasty's influence in Central Asia, Central Asian states such as the Karakhanids identified their state as China to invoke its prestige. The Karakhanid rulers used the title Tamghaj (or Ṭabgâch) Khan (Turkic:the Khan of China), translated by the Arabs as Malik al-mashriq wa’l-Ṣīn (the King of China and the East). The title continued to be used among the Karakhanids even after it split into eastern and western regimes. Karakhanid association with China went beyond just words, establishing commercial and even matrimonial relations with Sinitic states such as the Western Xia, Liao dynasty, Jin dynasty (1115–1234), and Song dynasty.

Tabgatch was among several names that were used by the Karakhanids and other Islamic sources to refer to China: al-Ṣīn (Chīn), Māṣīn (Māchīn), Tawghāch, Khiṭāy (Qitāy). These could be used to refer to China in general or certain parts of China, but it is uncertain what particular region or dynasty they referred to. Mahmud al-Kashgari, an 11th century Karakhanid scholar, thought China (Ṣīn) was divided into three parts: the Upper China in the east called Tawjāch, Middle China called Khitāy, and Lower China which is Barkhān near Kashgar. Sharaf al-Zaman al-Marwazi (fl. 1056/1057–1124/1125) also divided China into three parts but only used Tafghāj as the title of the emperor of Ṣīn, who was also called Faghfūr (son of god).

== Military ==
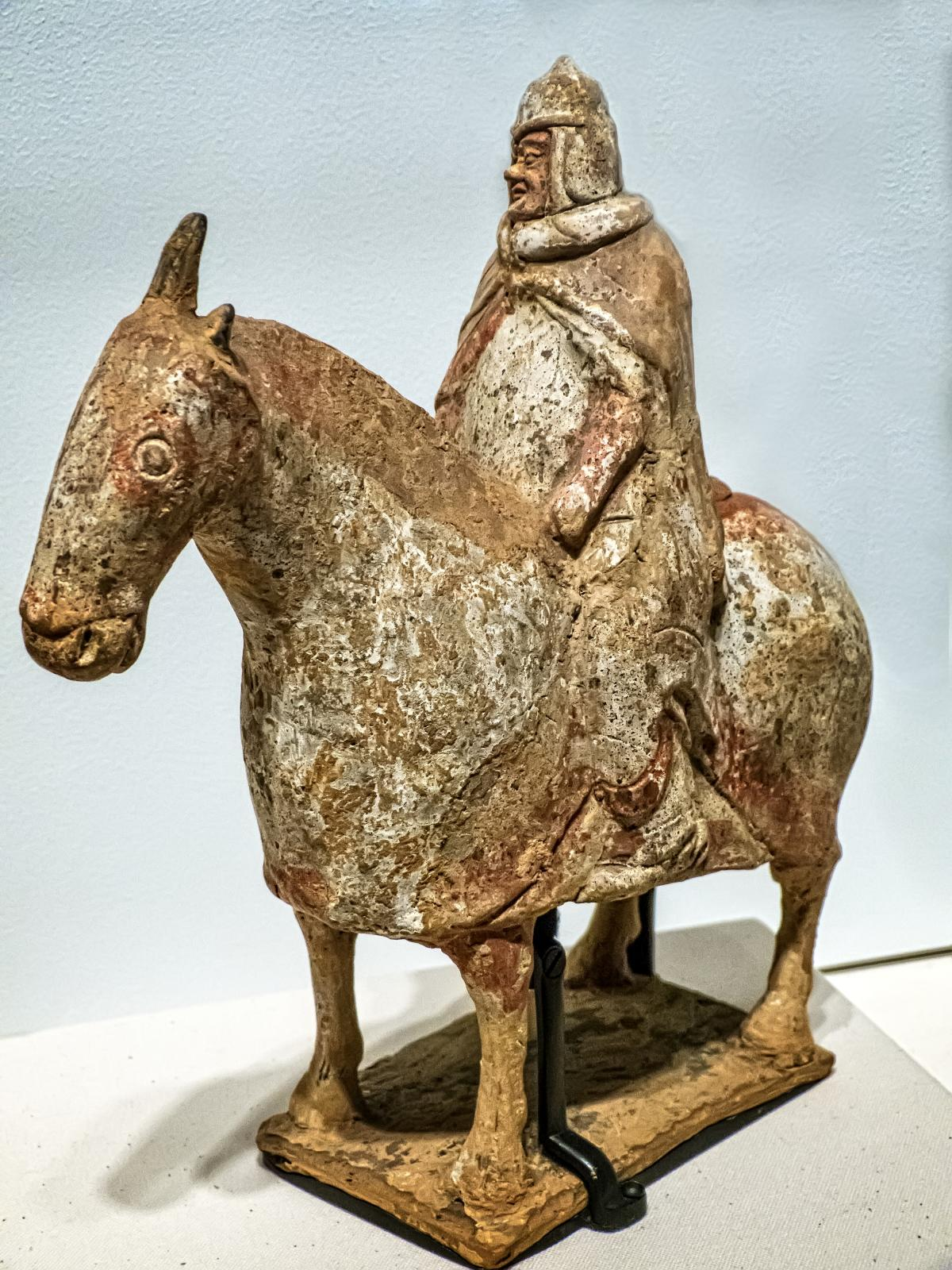
Mounted horseman figurine, Northern Wei

=== Northern army ===
The Xianbei lacked steel armor and sharp weapons according to late 4th century textual references.

The Xianbei military was originally composed of steppe cavalry. By 366, the Tuoba Xianbei claimed to command several hundred thousand mounted archers and controlled pastures that supported a million horses. Cavalry continued to serve as the core of the Xianbei military even after northern China was unified by Northern Wei (386–535 AD). Under the Northern Wei, the core of the military was composed of Xianbei people while the Han peasants served in logistical support roles or performed garrison duty as a form of corvée labor. Control of settlements was maintained by Xianbei warriors who lived apart from Han people. Beginning in 493, Emperor Xiaowen started a series of sicinizing policies that saw the capital moved further south to Luoyang in 493 under the pretext of conducting a military campaign. By 495, some 150,000 Xianbei warriors had been moved from the old capital of Pingcheng to serve as guardsmen and farmers in Luoyang. However, large numbers of Xianbei were left along the northern frontier around the old capital to guard against the Rouran Khaganate.

The northern garrisons were manned by Xianbei and Turkic speaking Tiele people while Han peasants provided food for them. There were also garrison families of Han descent who had assimilated into Xianbei culture. These garrisons originally occupied an important place in the Wei state but after the capital was moved to Luoyang, their status diminished. A divide grew between the northern and southern Xianbei where the latter became increasingly Chinese while the former stuck to the old Xianbei ways. The northern Xianbei garrisons were reclassified as fuhu (garrison households), a type of hereditary servile group. The southern Xianbei were better able to protect their status due to their proximity to power. In 519, a mob of guardsmen set fire to the home of a Han official who proposed barring military men from the highest civil posts, after which the idea was dropped. The elites of Luoyang came to regard garrison posts as hardship posts and only men of questionable quality were willing to be sent to the north. Many of these officials abused the people and used their authority to enrich themselves.

According to an eye witness gathering information on Emperor Xiaowen's invasion of Southern Qi in 494, the Northern Wei monarch lodged in a black felt "traveling palace" that could house 20 men. When on the road, the Emperor rode in a carriage surrounded by heavy cavalry guards wielding lances decorated with pure white plumage. All the foot soldiers held black shields and spears decorated with "toad streamers".

=== Eastern and western armies ===
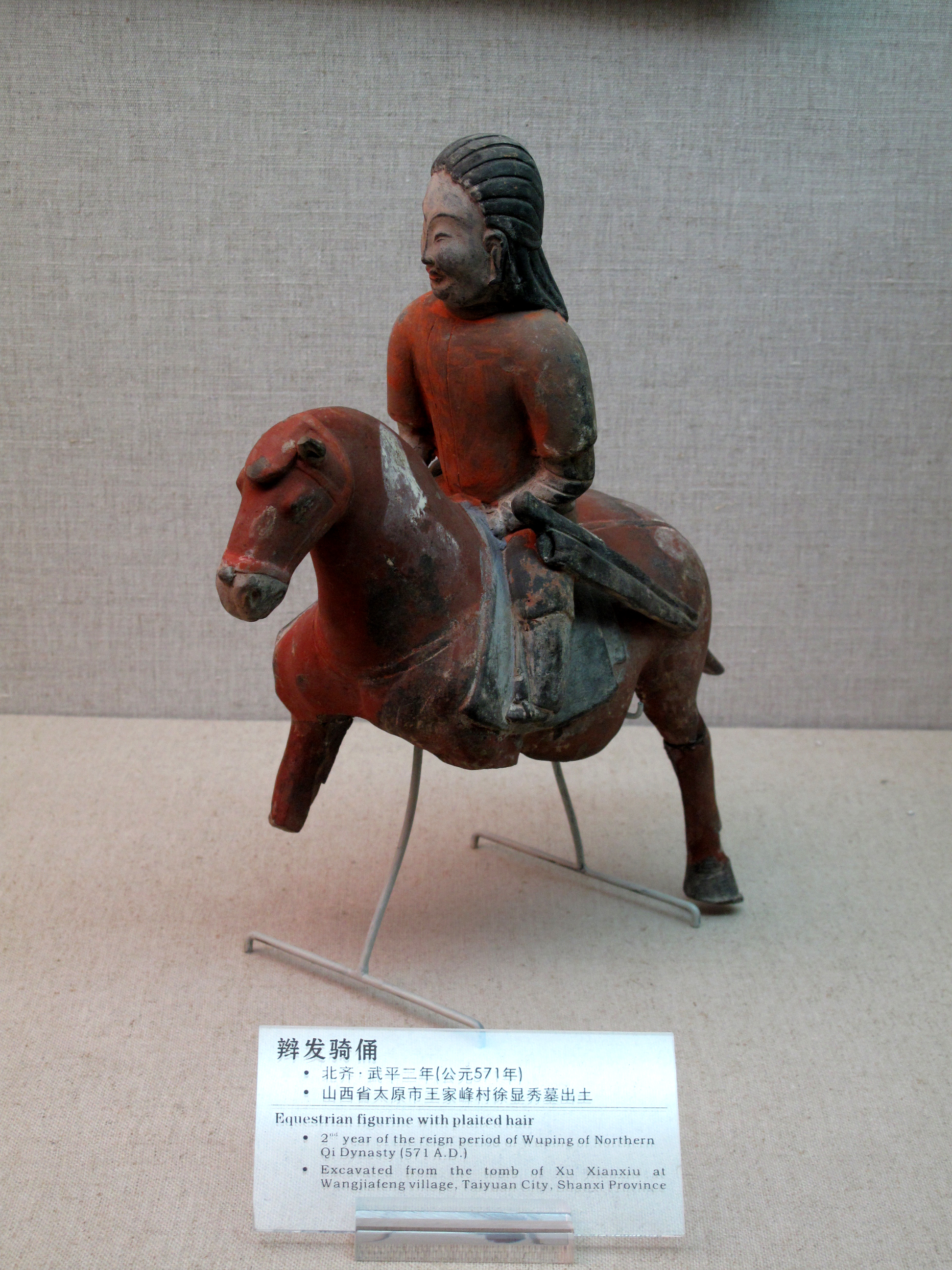
Northern Qi horseman figurine

After the rebellion of the six garrisons in 524, leaders from the northern garrisons took power and split the Northern Wei dynasty into two competing regimes in the east and west led by the ethnically Han and Xiongnu Gao and Yuwen clans that had assimilated into Xianbei culture. From 537 to 546, the two sides fought with no definitive outcome. After Gao Huan died in 546, the two sides settled into a low intensity conflict.

The Eastern Wei regime absorbed the greater portion of the Xianbei military class and preferred to deploy them over Han soldiers. Although Gao Huan originally deployed Han militias in battle, he had little faith in their fighting ability and divided the Han and Xianbei into discrete classes of labor and military men. In the 550s, certain Han men of exceptional bravery were enlisted for military service and in the last years of Northern Qi, Han peasants were conscripted into the military as part of their corvée obligation, but the majority of the eastern army remained largely composed of Xianbei and compatriot peoples. The Western regime however lacked the manpower to forego Han recruits and made significant use of them in their campaigns. Yuwen Tai's original force numbered in the single thousands and did not have the large reservoir of North Asian cavalry that was available to Gao Huan.

The Western Wei drew on militias organized by local strongmen known as xiang bing (local troops). They were given official positions in the government and deployed in battle against the Eastern Wei as early as 538. In the late 540s, these xiang bing were organized into a hierarchical command structure with leaders selected to lead local troops from individual prefectures (zhou). These militias continued to function as late as 580 just before the Northern Zhou was usurped by the Sui dynasty. Despite the significant boost these militias provided to the western army, they were not part of the main military establishment known as the Twenty-four Armies, which was the institutional forerunner of the fubing system of "territorial soldiery" that formed the early Sui and Tang armies.

The Twenty-four Armies' command structure was based on multiples of six. The top six commanders were all close associates of Yuwen Tai known as the "pillars of state" (zhu guo). Below these were 12 major-generals, each of whom commanded two armies led by "cavalry major-generals". Armies were composed of battalions (tuan), each of which were led by two "chariot-and-horse major-generals". The number of posts in the Twenty-four Armies increased significantly after 550 and most of the senior positions became sinecures that did not involve actual command of troops. "Cavalry generals" became the command-level position.

The Twenty-four Armies increased in size from 50,000 men in 550 to over 100,000 in the 570s. The choice to incorporate larger numbers of Han recruits into the army did not happen willingly or immediately. According to the Book of Zhou, after a significant defeat in 543, there was widespread recruitment of local strongmen into the army. A 13th-century encyclopedia says that in 550, "strong and able commoners [min] were registered as soldiers of the headquarters [fu bing]". In preparation for a final battle with the eastern regime, in 573 Northern Zhou eliminated household registrations used for taxation and corvée obligations for ordinary people (bai xing), who were recruited into the regular army. It was said that half the Han people became soldiers. It is uncertain if these recruits became full time soldiers or split their time between farming and military service, but most sources agree that the increasing size of the western army was due to the incorporation of ordinary Han farmers as infantry. The eastern regime on the other hand was mired in conflict between the civilian and military classes and rebellions in the east further weakened the Northern Qi, leading to its conquest by the Northern Zhou's Han-Xianbei army in 577.

== Culture ==
=== Lifestyle ===
The economic base of the Xianbei was animal husbandry combined with agricultural practice. They were the first to develop the khanate system. It is speculated that Tuoba Liwei was the first to use the title of khan.

The formation of social classes deepened and developments also occurred in their literacy, arts and culture. They used a zodiac calendar and favoured song and music. Tengrism and subsequently Buddhism were the main religions among the Xianbei people. After they abandoned the frigid north and migrated into Northern China, they gradually abandoned nomadic lifestyle and were sinicized and assimilated into the Han Chinese. Emperor Xiaowen of the Xianbei-led state of Northern Wei in northern China, eventually decreed the changes of Xianbei names to Han names. Prior to Tanshihuai, the Xianbei did not have a hereditary system, and their chieftains were chosen by electing a member of their tribe based on their character and abilities. Even as they established their states on the Central Plains and adopted the Chinese hereditary system, influential brothers, uncles and cousins of the Xianbei rulers often posed as rival claimants to the throne.

Same surname marriage was banned in 483 due to the sinicizing policy of Empress Dowager Feng. The ban was expanded to maternal surnames as well during the Northern Zhou dynasty, effectively banning consanguineous marriage.

=== Art ===
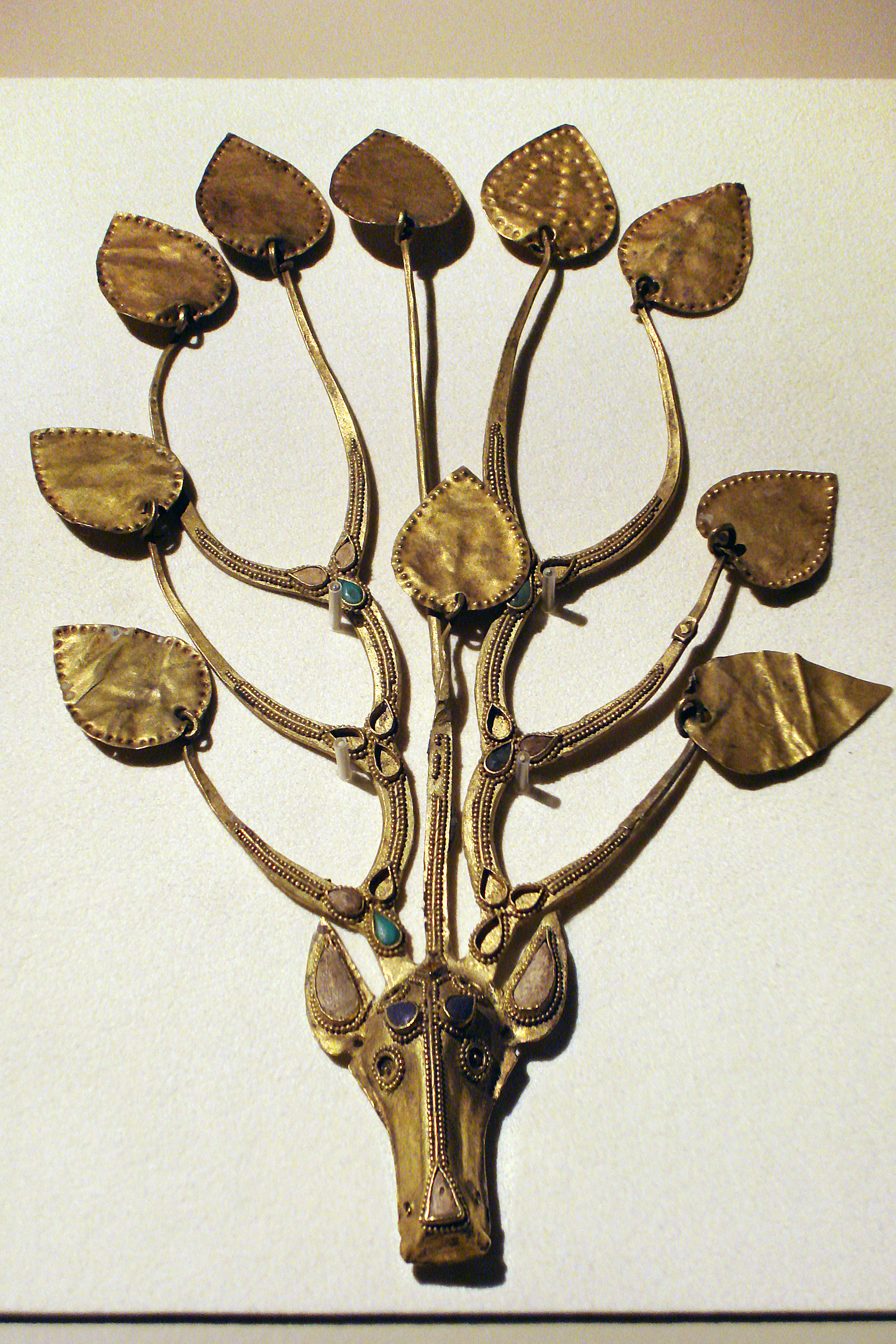
Xianbei head ornament with horse motif. Northern dynasties (A.D. 386 – 581)

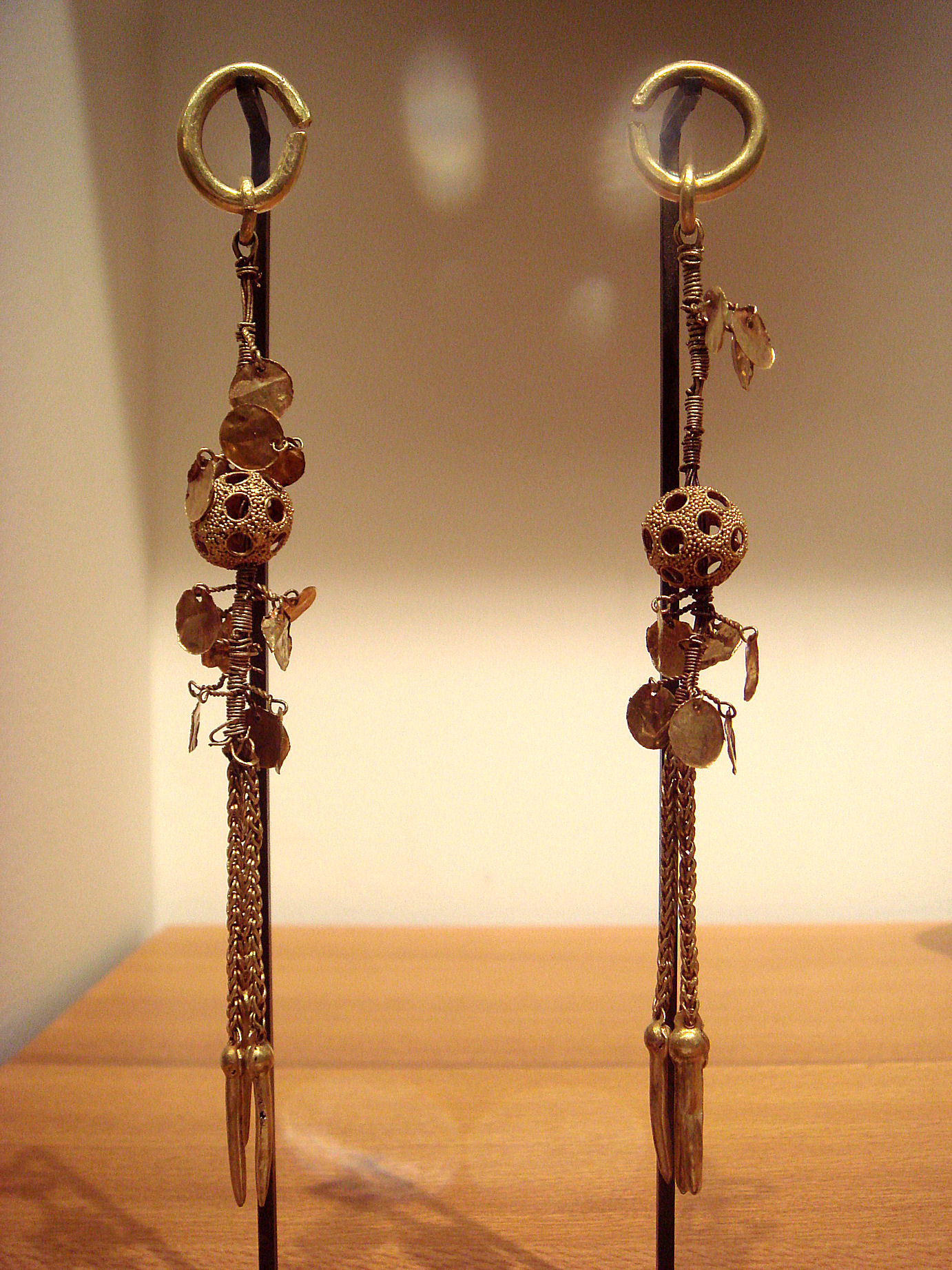
Northern Wei earrings. Northern Wei dynasty, 5th century

The leaf headdresses were characteristic of Xianbei culture, and are found especially in Murong Xianbei tombs. Their corresponding ornamental style also links the Xianbei to Bactria. These gold hat ornaments represented trees and antlers and, in Chinese, they are referred to as buyao ("step sway") since the thin metal leaves move when the wearer moves. Sun Guoping first uncovered this type of artifact, and defined three main styles: "Blossoming Tree" (huashu), which is mounted on the front of a cap near the forehead and has one or more branches with hanging leaves that are circle or droplet shaped, "Blossoming Top" (dinghua), which is worn on top of the head and resembles a tree or animal with many leaf pendants, and the rare "Blossoming Vine" (huaman), which consists of "gold strips interwoven with wires with leaves." Leaf headdresses were made with hammered gold and decorated by punching out designs and hanging the leaf pendants with wire. The exact origin, use, and wear of these headdresses is still being investigated and determined. However, headdresses similar to those later also existed and were worn by women in the courts.

Another key form of Xianbei art is animal iconography, which was implemented primarily in metalwork. The Xianbei stylistically portrayed crouching animals in geometricized, abstracted, repeated forms, and distinguished their culture and art by depicting animal predation and same-animal combat. Typically, sheep, deer, and horses were illustrated. The artifacts, usually plaques or pendants, were made from metal, and the backgrounds were decorated with openwork or mountainous landscapes, which harks back to the Xianbei nomadic lifestyle. With repeated animal imagery, an openwork background, and a rectangular frame, the included image of the three deer plaque is a paradigm of the Xianbei art style. Concave plaque backings imply that plaques were made using lost-wax casting, or raised designs were impressed on the back of hammered metal sheets.

Horses played a large role in the existence of the Xianbei as a nomadic people, and in one tomb, a horse skull lay atop Xianbei bells, buckles, ornaments, a saddle, and one gilded bronze stirrup. The Xianbei also made art depicting horses. A recurring motif was the winged horse. It has been suggested by archaeologist Su Bai that this symbol was a "heavenly beast in the shape of a horse" because of its prominence in Xianbei mythology.

== Language ==
Xianbei
- Serbi
- Native to: Xianbei
- Region: Mongolian–Manchurian grassland
- Ethnicity: Xianbei
- Era: c. 3rd century BC – c. 3rd century AD
- Language family: Serbi–Mongolic?: Para-Mongolic?; Xianbei

Language codes
- ISO 639-3: None (mis)
- Glottolog: None

=== Classification ===
According to the Book of the Later Han, "the language and culture of the Xianbei are the same as the Wuhuan".

The language of a subsect of the Xianbei, the Tuoba, was originally thought to be Turkic by many scholars during the first half of the 20th century. In the 1970s, Lajos Ligeti argued that the Xianbei and Tuoba languages were both actually Mongolic due to the existence of obvious Mongolic cognates. The Mongolic Xianbei argument gained ground from the 1980s onward as other scholars agreed that the Xianbei and Tuoba languages were actually Mongolic. Juha Janhunen, previously a proponent of a Turkic Tuoba language, changed his mind in 2003 and concluded that it was likely Mongolic and that a Turkic identification was incorrect. This mistake was in Janhunen's opinion, due to the existence of Turkic names and titles, which were widespread cultural words in the region. Claus Schönig points out that the first identifiable layer of Mongolic loanwords in Turkic languages is dated to the Xianbei period when the linguistic flow of Turkic into Mongolic was partially reversed.

There are still modern proponents of a Turkic Tuoba language. In 2005, Chen Sanping used new evidence from Tuoba onomastic data to argue that the core Tuoba clans likely spoke a Turkic language. Chen's argument for a Turkic Tuoba language has received pushback from a number of scholars including Alexander Vovin, Stephen G. Haw, and Chen Hao. Vovin criticized Chen for his lack of examples and the absence of comparative analysis using philologically attested materials, considering Chen's attempted revival of the idea of a Turkic Tuoba language to be a failure. Vovin used new reconstructions of Early Middle Chinese to study the Tuoba language and found that it shared unique similarities to the Manchu language such as the initial consonant m- that does not exist in Turkic languages. In 2012, Chen expanded on his argument by reiterating the onomastic data and separating the Tuoba into core clans that were Turkic and non-core clans that were Mongolic. However, a review of Chen's 2012 work by Haw found his new argument for a Turkic Tuoba language to be unconvincing. In 2020, Chen Hao also voiced opposition to Chen Sanping's argument for a Turkic Tuoba language.

Other more recent works by An-King Lim (2016, 2023) classifies Tuoba as a Turkic language, while Andrew Shimunek (2017) classifies Tuoba as a "Serbi" (i.e., para-Mongolic) language. Shimunek's Serbi branch also consists of the Tuyuhun and Khitan languages. In 2022, Charles Holcombe stated that the scholarly opinion has shifted in favor of the Tuoba language as Mongolic.

A number of Chinese authors such as Zhu Xueyuan (2000), Wuqilatu (2002), and Luo Xin (2009) regard the Xianbei language as Mongolic or proto-Mongolic.

It is also possible that the Xianbei spoke more than one language. Liu Xueyao argues that the Tuoba may have had their own language that was only broadly Ural-Atalic and should not be assumed to be identical with any other known languages. However, there are no remaining works written in Xianbei, which are thought to have been written using Chinese characters. Only a few words remain, such as 啊干 'elder brother'.

=== Writing system ===
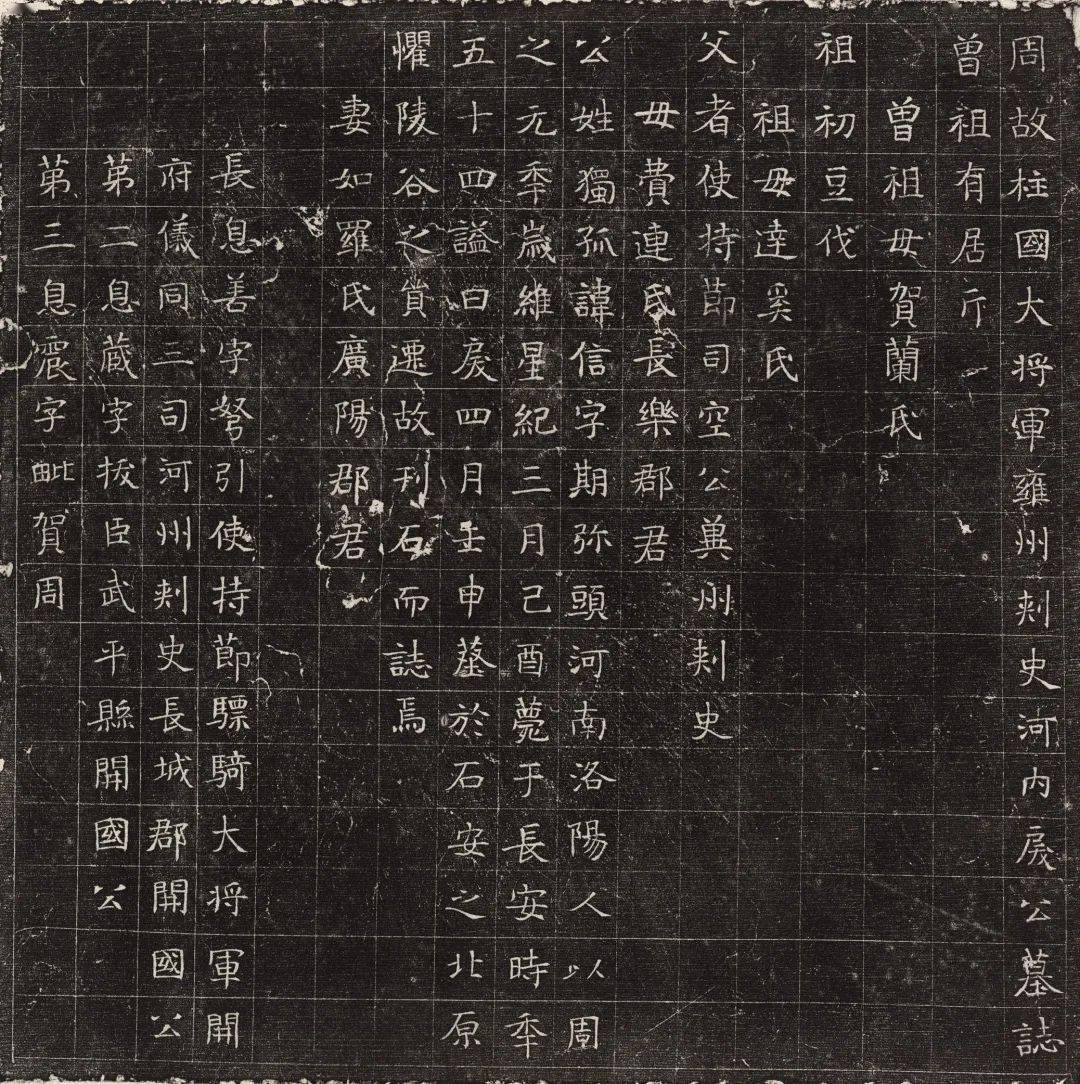
Epitaph of Dugu Xin (503–557)

By the time of the Wei (220–266) and Jin (266–420) dynasties, the northern ethnic groups such as the Xianbei, Xiongnu, and Di people widely used Chinese for writing. The Murong Xianbei established schools and compiled textbooks in Chinese. Emperor Xiaowen of Northern Wei was well versed in the Five Classics and composed literary works and poetry in Chinese.

Xiaowen had the Classic of Filial Piety translated into the Xianbei language but no Xianbei script is known to have existed. It is possible that Chinese characters were used solely for their phonetic values to represent the Xianbei language. A Chinese-like script resembling the Khitan large script and Jurchen script was discovered in the tomb of the Tuyuhun nobleman Murong Zhi (650–691). Daniel Kane and Marc Hideo Miyake posit that this script might have represented the Tuyuhun language and was a derivative of the Xianbei script.

== Anthropology ==
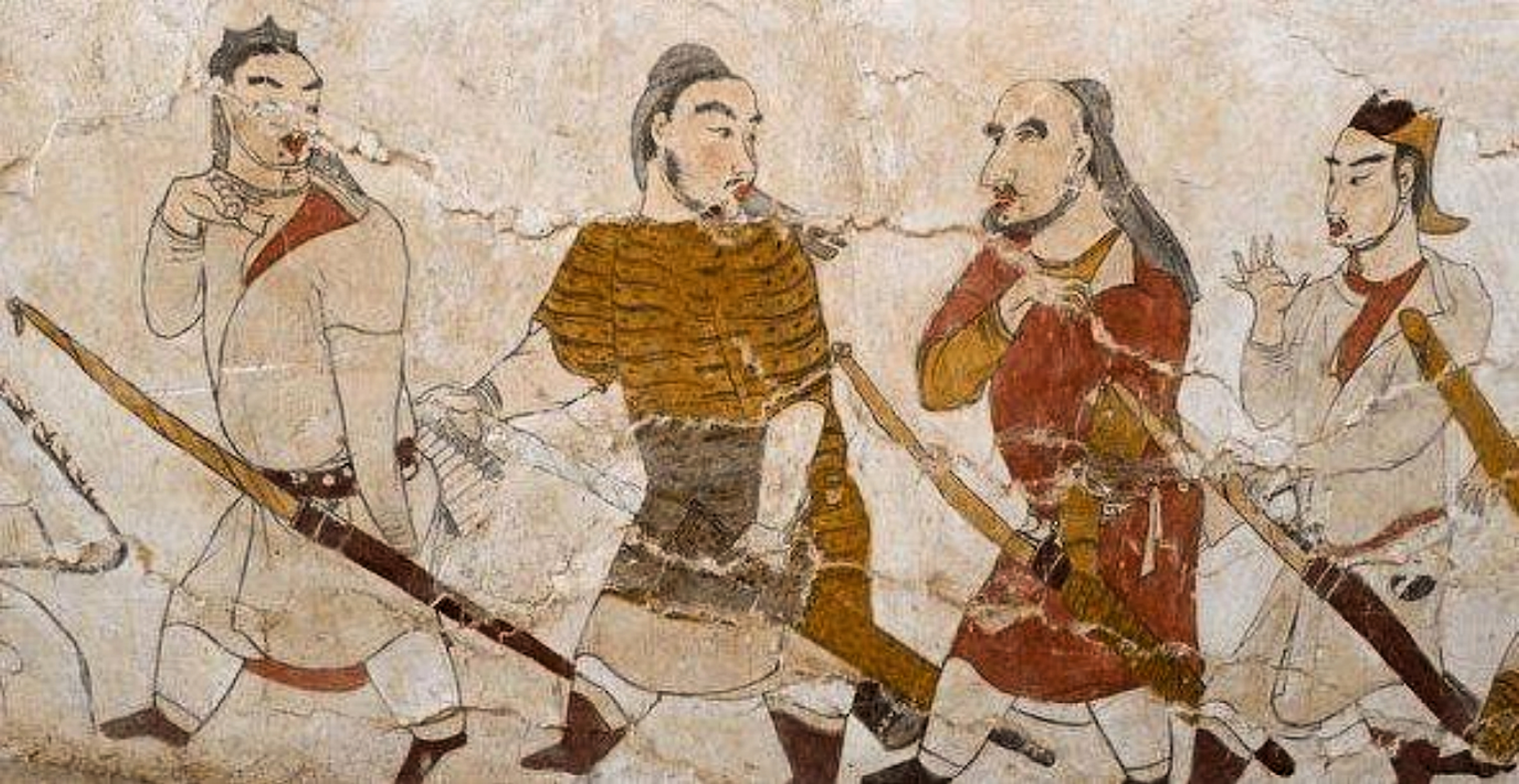
Xianbei warrior horsemen armed with long bows. Northern Qi dynasty (北齊 550–577 CE), Taiyuan, Shanxi Province.

According to Sinologist Penglin Wang, some Xianbei had mixed west Eurasian-featured traits such as blue eyes, blonde hair and white skin due to absorbing some Indo-European elements. The Xianbei were described as white on several occasions. The Book of Jin states that in the state of Cao Wei, Xianbei immigrants were known as the white tribe. The ruling Murong clan of Former Yan were referred to by their Former Qin adversaries as white slaves. According to Fan Wenlang et al. the Murong people were considered "white" by the Chinese due to the complexion of their skin color. In the Jin dynasty, Xianbei Murong women were sold off to many Han Chinese bureaucrat and aristocrats and they were also given to their servants and concubines. The mother of Emperor Ming of Jin, Lady Xun, was a lowly concubine possibly of Xianbei stock. During a confrontation between Emperor Ming and a rebel force in 324, his enemies were confused by his appearance, and thought he was a Xianbei due to his yellow beard. Emperor Ming's yellowish hair could have been inherited from his mother, who was either Xianbei or Jie. During the Tang dynasty, the poet Zhang Ji described the Xianbei entering Luoyang as "yellow-headed". During the Song dynasty, the poet and painter Su Shi was inspired by a painting of a Xianbei riding a horse and wrote a poem describing an elderly Xianbei with reddish hair and blue eyes.

There was undoubtedly some range of variation within their population. Yellow hair in Chinese sources could have meant brown rather than blonde and described other people such as the Jie rather than the Xianbei. Historian Edward H. Schafer believes many of the Xianbei were blondes, but others such as Charles Holcombe think it is "likely that the bulk of the Xianbei were not visibly very different in appearance from the general population of northeastern Asia."

Chinese anthropologist Zhu Hong and Zhang Quan-chao studied Xianbei crania from several sites of Inner Mongolia. They noted that anthropological features of studied Xianbei crania show that the racial type is closely related to the modern East-Asians, and some physical characteristics of those skulls are closer to modern Mongols, Manchu and Han Chinese.

According to Du, et al. (2024), while some historians have suggested that the Xianbei may have had "exotic" features such as high nose bridges, blond hair and thick beards, their genetic analysis of Emperor Wu of Northern Zhou is more in line with scholars who state that the appearance of the Xianbei was not dramatically different from modern East Asians. The genetic analysis revealed that Emperor Wu had an East Asian appearance, consistent with the hypothesis that the Xianbei appeared primarily East Asian.

== Genetics ==
Bronze Age distribution of predominant Y-chromosome haplogroups in Mongolia, northern China and southern Siberia.

A genetic study published in The FEBS Journal in October 2006 examined the mtDNA of 21 Tuoba Xianbei buried at the Qilang Mountain Cemetery in Inner Mongolia, China. The 21 samples of mtDNA extracted belonged to haplogroups O (9 samples), D (7 samples), C (5 samples), B (2 samples) and A. These haplogroups are characteristic of Northeast Asians. Among modern populations they were found to be most closely related to the Oroqen people.

A genetic study published in the Russian Journal of Genetics in April 2014 examined the mtDNA of 17 Tuoba Xianbei buried at the Shangdu Dongdajing cemetery in Inner Mongolia, China. The 17 samples of mtDNA extracted belonged to haplogroups D4 (four samples), D5 (three samples), C (five samples), A (three samples), G and B.

A genetic study published in the American Journal of Physical Anthropology in November 2007 examined 17 individuals buried at a Murong Xianbei cemetery in Lamadong, Liaoning, China ca. 300 AD. They were determined to be carriers of the maternal haplogroups J1b1, D (three samples), F1a (three samples), M, B, B5b, C (three samples) and G2a. These haplogroups are common among East Asians and some Siberians. The maternal haplogroups of the Murong Xianbei were noticeably different from those of the Huns and Tuoba Xianbei.

A genetic study published in the American Journal of Physical Anthropology in August 2018 noted that the paternal haplogroup C2b1a1b has been detected among the Xianbei and the Rouran, and was probably an important lineage among the Donghu people.

A full genome analysis published in November 2023 analyzed the genomic data of nine Xianbei individuals (ca. 200 CE to 300 CE), together with previous published Xianbei samples, covering almost the entire period of Xianbei as well as pre- and post-Xianbei periods, and found that the Xianbei displayed a homogenous population with nearly exclusive Ancient Northeast Asian ancestry. The authors further remark that these results are consistent with an Amur River region, specifically around the Greater Khingan mountain range area, origin for the ancestral Xianbei population. Early Xianbei did not display signs of admixture from surrounding groups, while later Xianbei displayed limited amounts of admixture with "late Xiongnu-Sarmatian-like" and Han Chinese ("Yellow River farmer-like") groups. Later Xianbei in Northern China adopted an agricultural lifestyle and mixed with the local population, contributing to the genetic history of Northern China.

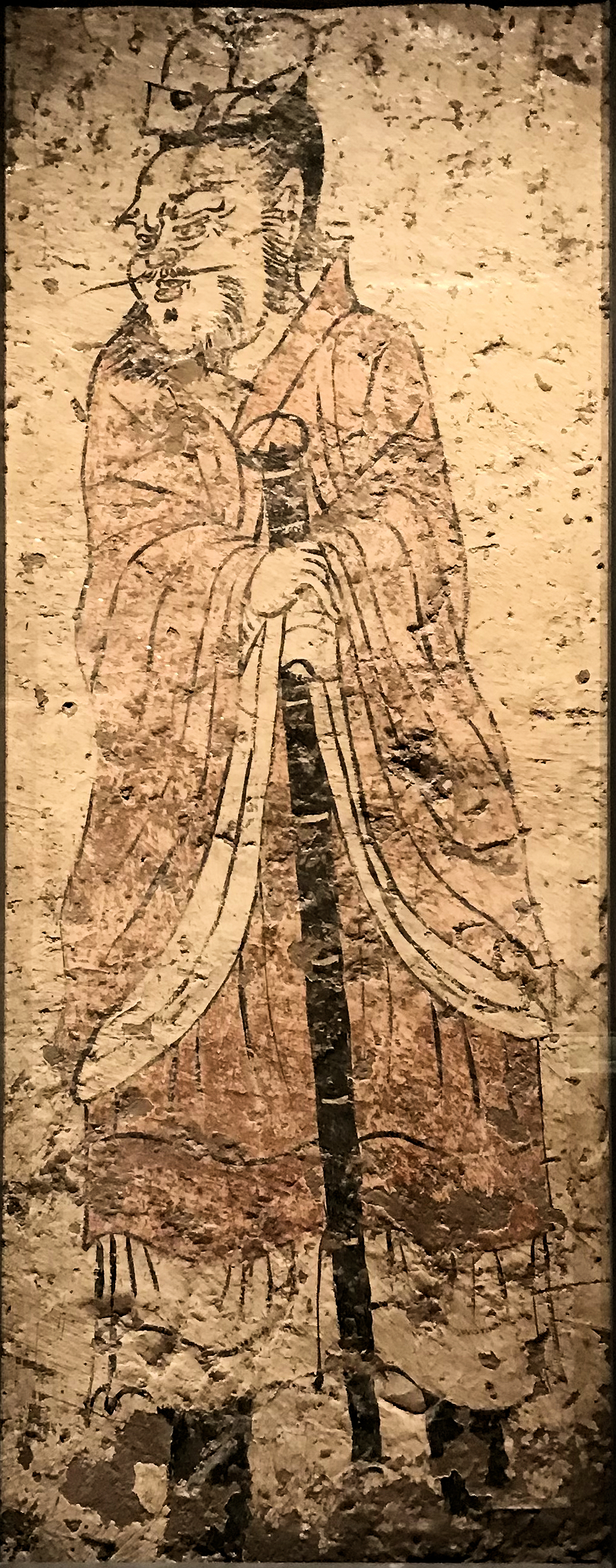
Painting of the Tuoba-Xianbei Northern Zhou general Li Xian (504–569 AD)

A 2024 study on Xianbei remains, including the remains of Emperor Wu of Northern Zhou, found them to be derived primarily from Ancient Northeast Asians at c. 62–96%, with a lower amount of admixture from Neolithic 'Yellow River farmers' (associated with Han Chinese) at c. 4–32%. The Yellow River ancestry of Emperor Wu might be due to his grandmother who had the surname Wang and was considered to be of Goguryeo descent, but was likely northern Han hailing from the Wang clan of Lelang Commandery. Western Steppe Herder ancestry was only found at low amounts or absent entirely among the different Xianbei remains (average at c. 2–7%). The analysed Xianbei remains display their closest genetic affinities to ancient Khitan and Mohe people, as well as modern-day Daur people and Mongolians. The amount of Ancient Northeast Asian and Yellow River farmer ancestries varied depending on geographic location, suggesting a form of heterogeneity among the ancient Xianbei. Emperor Wu represented the southernmost and highest admixture with Yellow River ancestry at ~32%. The westernmost Xianbei had the highest western Eurasian steppe genetic component at ~7%. The Xianbei individuals from eastern Mongolia had the highest Ancient Northeast Asian ancestry, up to 96%. In contrast to the Xianbei, the early Turkic ruling class, the Ashina tribe, was found to be nearly entirely derived from Ancient Northeast Asians without significant Yellow River ancestry.

A 2025 genetic study on three individuals with Xianbei names in an elite nuclear family dating to the Northern Zhou and Sui dynasty period showed that they were primarily related to farmers in northern China, which likely reflects the policy of bestowing Xianbei names on Han subjects in Western Wei. They were discovered in two tombs in Shaanxi province. An epitaph at the tomb entrance identifies its occupants as Bulugu Liang, a governor in the Northern Zhou dynasty, and his wife with the surname Daye, the daughter of the Duke of Longxi (Li Hu) in the Western Wei dynasty. Bulugu Liang is estimated to have died at around 30 years old, his wife Daye was an adult, and their son around 18-19 years old at the time of death. All three individuals fall within the East Asian gene pool, specifically modern populations in northern China. Although these individuals bore Xianbei names, autosomal analysis results show that both Bulugu and Daye were primarily related to agricultural populations in northern China at 95.8%–97.3% with minor genetic admixture from Eurasian Steppe pastoralists at 2.7%–4.2%. Both Bulugu and Daye's genetic profiles shares ~ 95% ancestry with Gao Bin, a confirmed Han aristocrat in the same dynasty, and ~ 5% Western Steppe ancestry. Their mitochondrial haplogroups, B4b1a3a and M8 respectively, are more commonly found in Han and Tibeto-Burman populations than in northern nomadic groups. Bulugu has haplogroups O2a2b1a2a and B4b1a3a. Haplogroup O2a2b1a2a is a downstream sub-clade of O-M134, one of the most common paternal lineages among Han Chinese and other East Asian populations, in contrast to haplogroup C-F1756 typically found in Xianbei nobility. This reflects the epitaph's description of Bulugu's ancestry, that he was the son of Lu Tong, a Han noble who had served in the Guanzhong region and was granted the Xianbei name Bulugu. Based on these results, the authors suggest that it is likely that these individuals were Han aristocrats who were given Xianbei names as part of the historical policy in Northern Zhou.

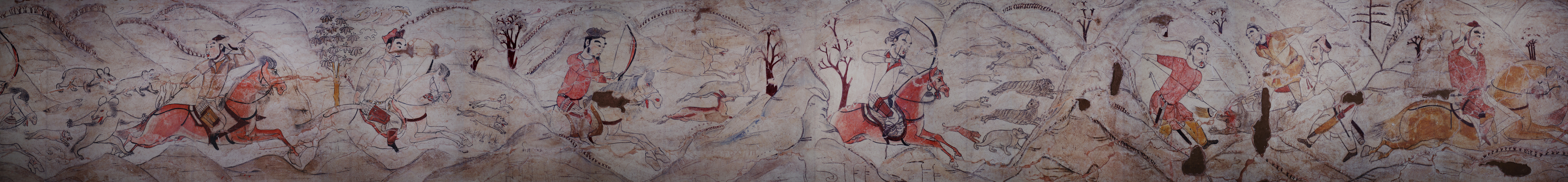
Northern Qi hunting scene
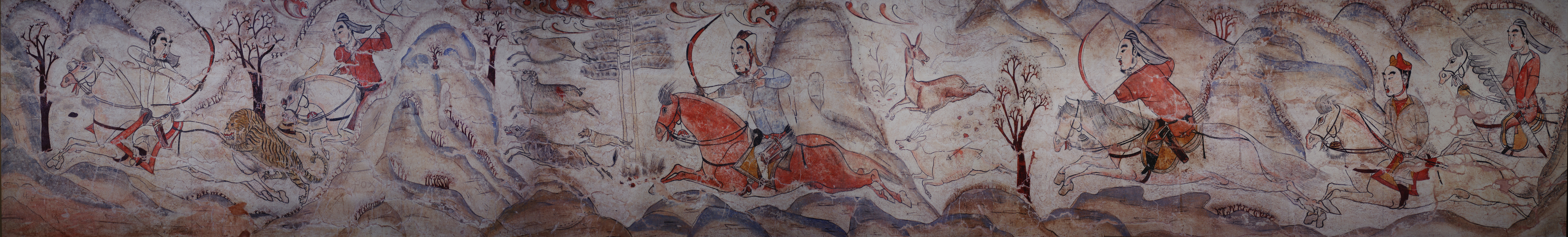
Northern Qi hunting scene

== Modern descendants ==
Most Xianbei clans adopted Chinese family names during the Northern Wei dynasty. In particular, many were sinicized under Emperor Xiaowen of Northern Wei.

The Northern Wei's Eight Noble Xianbei surnames 八大贵族 were the Buliugu 步六孤, Helai 賀賴, Dugu 獨孤, Helou 賀樓, Huniu 忽忸, Qiumu 丘穆, Gexi 紇奚, and Yuchi 尉遲.

The "Monguor" (Tu) people in modern China may have descended from the Xianbei who were led by Tuyuhun Khan to migrate westward and establish the Tuyuhun Kingdom (284–670) in the third century and Western Xia (1038–1227) through the thirteenth century. Today they are primarily distributed in Qinghai and Gansu Province, and speak a Mongolic language.

The Xibe or "Xibo" people also believe they are descendants of the Xianbei, with considerable controversies that have attributed their origins to the Jurchens, the Elunchun, and the Xianbei.

Xianbei descendants among the Korean population carry surnames such as Mo 모 (Chinese: 慕; pinyin: mù; Wade–Giles: mu (shortened from Murong)), 석; (Revised Romanization: Seok; McCune–Reischauer: Sŏk; Chinese: 石; pinyin: shí; Wade–Giles: shih (shortened from Wushilan 烏石蘭)), 원 (Revised Romanization: Won; McCune–Reischauer: Wŏn; Chinese: 元; pinyin: yuán; Wade–Giles: yüan (the adopted Chinese surname of the Tuoba) and Dokgo 독고 (Chinese: 獨孤; pinyin: Dúgū; Wade–Giles: Tuku (from Dugu)).

== Bibliography ==
- Abramson, Marc S. (2008), Ethnic Identity in Tang China, University of Pennsylvania Press
- Biran, Michal (2005), The Empire of the Qara Khitai in Eurasian History: Between China and the Islamic World, Cambridge University Press
- Hao, Chen (2020), Inventing Surnames: A case study of Tabgach identity construction, Acta Orientalia Hung
- Chen, Sanping (2012), Multicultural China in the Early Middle Ages, University of Pennsylvania Press
- Choi, Jinyeol (2024), The Death of a Language? The Xianbei Language after Emperor Xiaowen's Ban, Korea National University of Heritage
- Cosmo, Nicola di (2009), Military Culture in Imperial China, Harvard University Press
- de Crespigny, Rafe (2007). A Biographical Dictionary of Later Han to the Three Kingdoms (23-220 AD). doi:10.1163/ej.9789004156050.i-1311. ISBN 978-90-474-1184-0.
- de Crespigny, Rafe (2010). Imperial Warlord. doi:10.1163/ej.9789004185227.i-554. ISBN 978-90-04-18830-3.
- de Crespigny, Rafe (2017). Fire over Luoyang. doi:10.1163/9789004325203. ISBN 978-90-04-32520-3.
- Dien, Albert E. (2019), The Cambridge History of China Volume 2 The Six Dynasties, 220-589, Cambridge University Press
- Duturaeva, Dilnoza (2018), Qarakhanid Envoys to Song China, Harrassowitz Verlag
- Ebrey, Patricia Buckley (2010), The Cambridge Illustrated History of China, Cambridge University Press
- Golden, Peter Benjamin (2013). Curta, Florin; Maleon, Bogdan-Petru (eds.). "Some Notes on the Avars and Rouran". The Steppe Lands and the World Beyond Them. Iași: Editura Universității "A.I. Cuza" Publisher: 43–66.
- Graff, David A. (2002), Medieval Chinese Warfare, 300-900, Routledge
- Graff, David A. (2016), The Eurasian Way of War: Military practice in seventh-century China and Byzantium, Routledge
- Haw, Stephen G. (2012), Review of Multicultural China in the Early Middle Ages, Journal of the Royal Asiatic Society
- Holcombe, Charles (2013), The Xianbei in Chinese History
- Holcombe, Charles (2022a), The Tabgatch empire and the idea of China, The Historian
- Kane, Daniel; Miyake, Marc Hideo (2023), "5: Jurchen", The Tungusic Languages, Taylor & Francis
- Kornicki, Peter Francis (2018), Languages, Scripts, and Chinese Texts in East Asia, Oxford University Press
- Li, Jiawei; et al. (August 2018). "The genome of an ancient Rouran individual reveals an important paternal lineage in the Donghu population". American Journal of Physical Anthropology. 166 (4). American Association of Physical Anthropologists: 895–905. Bibcode:2018AJPA..166..895L. doi:10.1002/ajpa.23491. PMID 29681138.
- Liu, Zhiji (2023), A Thorough Exploration in Historiography / Shitong, University of Washington Press
- Pearce, Scott (2023), Northern Wei (386-534): A New Form of Empire in East Asia, Oxford University Press
- Skaff, Jonathan Karam (2012). Sui-Tang China and Its Turko-Mongol Neighbors: Culture, Power, and Connections, 580–800. Oxford Studies in Early Empires. Oxford University Press.
- Twitchett, Denis (2008), The Cambridge History of China: Volume 1, Cambridge University Press
- Janhunen (27 January 2006). The Mongolic Languages. Routledge. p. 393. ISBN 978-1-135-79690-7.
- Wang, Haijing; et al. (November 2007). "Molecular genetic analysis of remains from Lamadong cemetery, Liaoning, China". American Journal of Physical Anthropology. 134 (3). American Association of Physical Anthropologists: 404–411. Bibcode:2007AJPA..134..404W. doi:10.1002/ajpa.20685. PMID 17632796.
- Wang, Feng (2026), From Chinese Characters to Sinographic Scripts: A Study of Writing Systems in the Sinosphere, China Social Sciences Press
- Watt, James C. Y. (2004). China: Dawn of a Golden Age, 200–750 AD. Metropolitan Museum of Art. ISBN 978-1-58839-126-1.
- West, Barbara A. (2009), Encyclopedia of the Peoples of Asia and Oceania, Facts on File
- Xiong, Victor Cunrui (2017), Historical Dictionary of Medieval China, Bloomsbury Publishing
- Yang, Shao-yun (2014), Fan and Han: The Origins and uses of a Conceptual Dichotomy in Mid-Imperial China, ca. 500-1200, Otto Harrassowitz
- Yu, Changchun; et al. (20 October 2006). "Genetic analysis on Tuoba Xianbei remains excavated from Qilang Mountain Cemetery in Qahar Right Wing Middle Banner of Inner Mongolia". The FEBS Journal. 580 (26). Wiley: 6242–6246. Bibcode:2006FEBSL.580.6242C. doi:10.1016/j.febslet.2006.10.030. PMID 17070809.
- Yu, C.-C.; et al. (6 April 2014). "Genetic analyses of Xianbei populations about 1,500–1,800 years old". Russian Journal of Genetics. 50 (3). Springer: 308–314. doi:10.1134/S1022795414030119.
- Zhou, Xiuqin (2024), Creation and Separation: A Chinese Emperor's Six Stone Horses, University of Pennsylvania Museum
