= Five Barbarians =

Chinese historical exonym

The Five Barbarians, or Wu Hu (Chinese: 五胡; pinyin: Wǔ Hú), is a Chinese historical exonym for five ancient non-Han "Hu" peoples who immigrated to northern China in the Eastern Han dynasty, and then overthrew the Western Jin dynasty and established their own kingdoms in the 4th–5th centuries. The peoples categorized as the Five Barbarians were the Xiongnu, Jie, Xianbei, Qiang and Di.

Out of the five tribal ethnic groups, the Xiongnu, Jie and Xianbei were nomadic peoples from the northern steppes. The Di and Qiang were from the highlands of western China. The Qiang were predominantly herdsmen, while the Di were farmers. While these people's ethnic identity is uncertain, theories and research suggest that they may have Turkic, Proto-Mongolic, Tibeto-Burman or Tungusic origins.

Although the term "Five Barbarians" is often used alongside the Sixteen Kingdoms, there were in fact more than five relevant non-Han groups during the period, such as the Dingling and Wuhuan. Patrilineally, the ruling family of Cheng-Han descended from the Bandun Man or Zong, though they are referred to as Ba Di due to their intermarriage with the Di. The Juqu clan of Northern Liang were Lushuihu, a complex multiethnic people, but are often classified as Xiongnu in historiography. Gao Yun, who can either be interpreted as the last ruler of Later Yan or first ruler of Northern Yan, was an ethnic Goguryeo.

== Definition ==
Five Virtues Cycle

The "Five Barbarians" or "Wu Hu" (五胡) first appeared in an edict written by Empress Dowager Chu Suanzi of the Eastern Jin dynasty in 357 CE, though the conventional understanding of the term today only took shape in the Southern Song period, almost a thousand years later. Some modern scholars believe that the initial usage of "Wu Hu" did not refer to five specific ethnic groups, but was instead related to the theoretical concept of the Five Virtues Cycle. The cycle was invoked by ancient Chinese rulers to justify dynastic transitions, with the ruler of a new dynasty adopting an element (Fire, Water, Wood, Metal, and Earth) generated by the element of the previous dynasty. During the Sixteen Kingdoms period, prophecies were an important tool for non-Han people to legitimize their regimes, and many were familiar with the Five Virtues. As ethnic minorities rose and conquered one another for control over northern China, a popular prophecy subsequently emerged among them, foretelling a sequence of five "barbarian" dynasties (五胡次序; "Sequence of the Five Barbarians") based on the Five Virtues Cycle. One example of this sequence is as follows: Western Jin (Han Chinese; Metal) → Later Zhao (Jie; Water) → Former Qin (Di; Wood) → Later Qin (Qiang; Fire).

When the prophecy circulated among the general population, however, the cryptic meaning of the Wu Hu was not well understood. Officials of the Eastern Jin and later Chinese dynasties used it as a blanket term to refer to the various non-Han ethnic at the time. Meanwhile, the Xianbei-led Northern Wei dynasty, who unified the north in 439 CE, also considered their Sixteen Kingdoms predecessors as illegitimate. They initially adopted the element of Earth, based on the same element as the Yellow Emperor who they claimed descent from. Later on, during Emperor Xiaowen's sinicization reforms, they claimed the element of Water, directly generated by the Western Jin's Metal.

During the Southern Song period, the official Hong Mai (1123–1202 CE) wrote an essay titled "Wuhu Luanhua" (五胡亂華; "Upheaval of the Five Barbarians") in his book the Rongzhai Suibi (容齋隨筆), but did not classify the five. It was only later when another Song official, Wang Yinglin (1223–1296 CE) published his Xiaoxue Ganzhu (小學紺珠) that the Five Barbarians were listed as "Liu Yuan's Xiongnu, Shi Le's Jie, Murong Huang's Xianbei, Fu Hong's Di and Yao Chang's Qiang." A contemporary of Wang, Hu Sanxing (1230–1302 CE), affirmed his interpretation by including it in his annotation of the Zizhi Tongjian, after which it became widely accepted.

The Five Barbarians were a mix of tribes from various stocks, such as proto-Mongolic, Turkic, Tibetan and Yeniseian. Others divide them into two Turkic tribes, one Tungusic tribe, and two Tibetan tribes, and yet others into Tibetan and Altaic (proto-Mongolian and early Turkic). However, their rulers were sinicized to varying degrees, having lived near or inside the borders of the Chinese empire for generations and being exposed to Chinese culture.

== The Five Barbarians ==
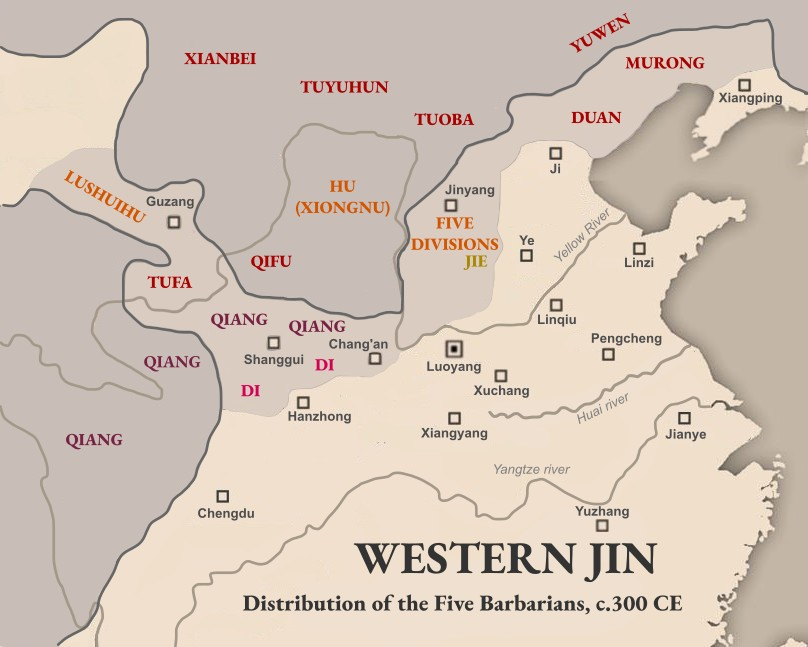
Distribution of the Five Barbarians during the Western Jin dynasty.

=== Xiongnu ===
Once a powerful empire on the eastern Eurasian steppe that rivalled the Han dynasty, the Xiongnu were reduced to living in Shanxi and Shaanxi as Chinese subjects by the 3rd century CE. As nomads, they were mainly employed as auxiliary cavalry, but many began to take up agriculture as their lifestyle became more sedentary. The abolition of the chanyu in 216 CE saw the Xiongnu identity gradually became obsolete as their descendants miscegenated and assimilated into their surrounding communities. They were vaguely referred to as "Hu" (胡), or became part of larger "mixed Hu" groups (雜胡; záhú). Nonetheless, some retained memories of their Xiongnu lineage, using them as a form of legitimacy for their imperial ambitions.

The Han-Zhao dynasty (304–329 CE), who facilitated the fall of the Western Jin, was founded by Liu Yuan of the Five Divisions. The Five Divisions was initially formed by the Chinese court out of the Xiongnu people in Shanxi. Liu Yuan claimed direct descent from the chanyus, but he and his followers were highly sinicized, even claiming kinship to the imperial Liu clan of the Han dynasty. They had also evidently fused with another people known as the Chuge, who replaced the Xiongnu as the primary identity among the Five Divisions. A century later, a distant relative of the Han-Zhao clan, the Tiefu, established the Helian Xia dynasty (407–431 CE) under Helian Bobo in the Ordos Plateau. The Tiefu were a nomadic tribe who were also mixed themselves, with their tribal name denoting "Xiongnu father, Xianbei mother".

In Gansu, the Northern Liang (397–439 CE) was led by the Juqu clan of the Lushuihu people. The Lushuihu were likely a multiethnic group consisting of the Lesser Yuezhi and Qiang, but strong traces of the Xiongnu were also present among them. While not necessarily Xiongnu, the Juqu ancestors once served under their empire, and adopted the office they held as their clan’s name.

=== Jie ===
The Jie were a people closely tied to the Xiongnu, though are considered separate in the Five Barbarians terminology. It is believed that their ancestors were part of subordinate tribes of the Xiongnu who were brought over to Shanxi, but their exact origin is a matter of extensive debate. Their physical descriptions suggest that they were of Indo-European stock, perhaps Sogdian or Yuezhi, while studies on their language have also linked them to the Ket people of Siberia. Others posited that they were a mixed people, and did not solely belong to a single ethnicity.

The Jie rose and fell within the first half 4th century CE under the Later Zhao dynasty (319–351 CE). Their founder, Shi Le was a descendant of the Qiangqu tribe (possibly a transliteration of Kangju) from the Southern Xiongnu. The Later Zhao ruled most of northern China for a time before descending into civil war in 349 CE. That year, many of the Jie were massacred as part of Ran Min's cull order, and the Jie presumably disappeared soon after.

=== Xianbei ===
With the decline of the Xiongnu Empire, the Xianbei people soon supplanted them as the dominant power of the steppe. The confederation of Tanshihuai brought them to their peak and threatened the Han in the 2nd century CE, but soon broke apart following his death. Many of the Xianbei tribes migrated southward and became vassals of the Chinese court. They were widely distributed across the northern frontiers and made excellent cavalrymen. The Chinese often deployed them in their military campaigns, and even rewarded a few of the tribes with their own fiefdoms.

In the far northeast of modern Liaoning, the Murong were the most influential throughout the Sixteen Kingdoms. After the fall of Western Jin, the Murong formed the Former Yan (337–370 CE) and annexed their rivals, the Duan and Yuwen. They then went on to expand their influence into Hebei, becoming a regional power in the northeastern China. Despite being briefly conquered, members of the Murong attempted to revive their state, including the Later Yan (384–409 CE), Western Yan (384–394 CE) and Southern Yan (398–410 CE). Besides the Murong, the Duan were also able to form their short-lived state of Duan Qi (350–356 CE) in Shandong.

The Xianbei also had a notable presence in the northwest. The Qifu tribe formed the Western Qin (385–431 CE) in eastern Gansu, while the Tufa tribe founded the Southern Liang (397–414 CE) in northeastern Qinghai. Further into the Qinghai Plateau, a branch of the Murong migrated and subjugated many of the local Qiang tribes, becoming known as the Tuyuhun (284–670 CE).

The Tuoba in northern Shanxi initially formed the state of Dai (310–376 CE) and maintained most of their nomadic way of life on the steppe. After also being briefly conquered, their state was soon restored as the Northern Wei (386–535 CE). The Tuoba went on to defeat the Murong and unify the rest of northern China, thus bringing the Sixteen Kingdoms to an end. For more than a century, the Xianbei would dominate the north and enter a stalemate with the Chinese court in the south during the Northern and Southern Dynasties period.

=== Qiang ===
During the Han dynasty, the Qiang mainly referred to a collection of nomadic pastoralist tribes in the western regions of modern Gansu and Qinghai. They were not a unified nation and lived in various separate tribes. However, following the Han's expansion into the Hexi Corridor in 121 BCE, their tribes frequently formed alliances with each another to wage war against Chinese for centuries. The Han met their resistance with force, but also had many of their people resettled as far east as Shaanxi, where they worked as farmers or slaves and conscripted as soldiers. The resettled Qiang slowly assimilated into Chinese society, but their rebellions were frequent and became a consistent issue for the imperial court in northwestern China.

Despite their large population, the only Qiang state among the traditional Sixteen Kingdoms was the Later Qin (384–417 CE), founded by Yao Chang in central Shaanxi. The ruling house were descendants of the powerful Shaodang tribe, but by the time they came to power, they were thoroughly sinicized while embracing Buddhism as their religion. Outside the western frontier, the rise of the Tuyuhun saw several of the native Qiang tribes coalesce and form their own kingdoms of Dangchang and Dengzhi on the eastern edges of Qinghai.

=== Di ===
The Di were a group of tribes culturally related to the Qiang peoples. Their population was initially concentrated in the region of present-day Longnan, Gansu, which was annexed by the Han in 111 BCE. Later on, a significant number of them were forcibly relocated by the Han warlord, Cao Cao to eastern Gansu and central Shaanxi, where they lived among the Chinese, Qiang and others. While the Di practised pastoralism from time to time, they were predominantly a farming people, and were relatively accustomed to Chinese culture.

The Di regimes of the Sixteen Kingdoms all had roots in Lüeyang Commandery (略陽郡; roughly modern day Tianshui, Gansu). The most powerful of them was the Former Qin dynasty (351–394 CE), who under the rule of their third ruled, Fu Jian, grew from central Shaanxi to briefly unify all of northern China, but soon disintegrated after the disastrous defeat at the Battle of Fei River in 383 CE. The Di general, Lü Guang, took the opportunity to establish the Later Liang (386–403 CE) in Gansu during the collapse. In Longnan, the Baiqing Di tribe founded the petty kingdom of Chouchi (296–580 CE), which was able to survive long past the Sixteen Kingdoms in numerous iterations.

The Cheng-Han dynasty (304–347 CE), established by Li Xiong, was the first state among the Sixteen Kingdoms. Their ruling family were actually a southern people known as the Zong, but their family had intermixed with the Di people of Lüeyang. They were thus also known as Ba Di, with "Ba" in reference to their origins in Sichuan.

== See also ==
- History of China
  - Han dynasty
  - Three Kingdoms
  - Jin dynasty (266–420)
  - Sixteen Kingdoms
  - Southern and Northern Dynasties
  - Northern Wei Dynasty
- Shiliuguo Chunqiu
- List of past Chinese ethnic groups
