= Wuhu (disambiguation) =

Wuhu is a prefecture-level city in Anhui, China.

Wuhu may also refer to:

- WUHU, a radio station licensed to Smiths Grove, Kentucky, United States
- WUHU (software), Weather Underground / HeavyWeather Uploader, software to upload data from personal weather stations to one or more networks
- Five Barbarians (Wu Hu), a collective term for various non-Chinese steppe tribes during the period from the Han dynasty to the Northern Dynasties
- Wu Hu period (304–439 AD), or Sixteen Kingdoms, in ancient China
- Wu Hu uprising (304–316 CE), a rebellion of unsinicized peoples against Jin China
- Wuhu Island, a fictional island in the Wii video game series

== See also ==
- Woo Hoo (disambiguation)
- Wuhua (disambiguation)
