= Wahoo (disambiguation) =

Wahoo (Acanthocybium solandri) is a scombrid fish found worldwide in tropical and subtropical seas.

Wahoo may also refer to:

== Biology ==
- Eastern wahoo (Euonymus atropurpureus), a shrub native to eastern North America, also known as American wahoo or wahoo fruit
- Ulmus alata, the winged elm or wahoo, a deciduous tree in the southeastern and south central United States

== Geography ==
- Wahoo, California, a former settlement
- Wahoo, Nebraska, a city
- Wahoo, West Virginia, an unincorporated community in Marion County
- Wahoo Township, Saunders County, Nebraska, a township
- Wahoo, Florida, a populated area in Florida

== Ships ==
- USS Wahoo (SS-238), a Gato-class submarine, commanded by Dudley "Mush" Morton, which became famous during World War II
- USS Wahoo (SS-516), a Tench-class submarine, was assigned the name, but was canceled before her keel was laid down
- USS Wahoo (SS-518), also a Tench-class submarine, was laid down, but she was cancelled before being launched
- USS Wahoo (SS-565), a Tang-class submarine, which served during the Cold War
- USS Wahoo (SSGN-806), a planned Virginia-class submarine

== Sports ==
- Chief Wahoo, a mascot for the Cleveland Indians baseball team
- Wahoos (University of Virginia), an unofficial nickname for sports teams of the University of Virginia, officially referred to as the Cavaliers
- Wahoo McDaniel (1938–2002), American football player turned professional wrestler
- Pensacola Blue Wahoos, minor league baseball team located in Pensacola, FL
- "Wahoo Sam" Crawford, major league baseball Hall of Famer

== Other uses ==
- Wahoo!, a 1965 album by American pianist and arranger Duke Pearson
- Wahoo (board game), a board game
- Wahoo! (company), a United States-based corporation which built fiberglass recreational boats from 1985 to 1996
- Wahoo (underwater nuclear test), conducted as part of Operation Hardtack I
- Wahoo Fitness, a manufacturer of cycling and fitness technology
- Wahoo's Fish Taco

== See also ==
- Yahoo (disambiguation)
- Woo Hoo (disambiguation)
- Big Chief Wahoo, comic strip and character
- Battle of Wahoo Swamp, (1838) of the Second Seminole War in Sumter County, Florida
