= Wuhua =

Wuhua may refer to:

- Wuhua County (五华县), Guangdong, China
- Wuhua District (五华区), Kunming, China
- Wuhua dialect, is a major dialect of the Hakka Chinese language

== See also ==
- Wuhu (disambiguation)
