= Dengzhi =

Chinese state

Dengzhi 鄧至
- 5th century–c. 554
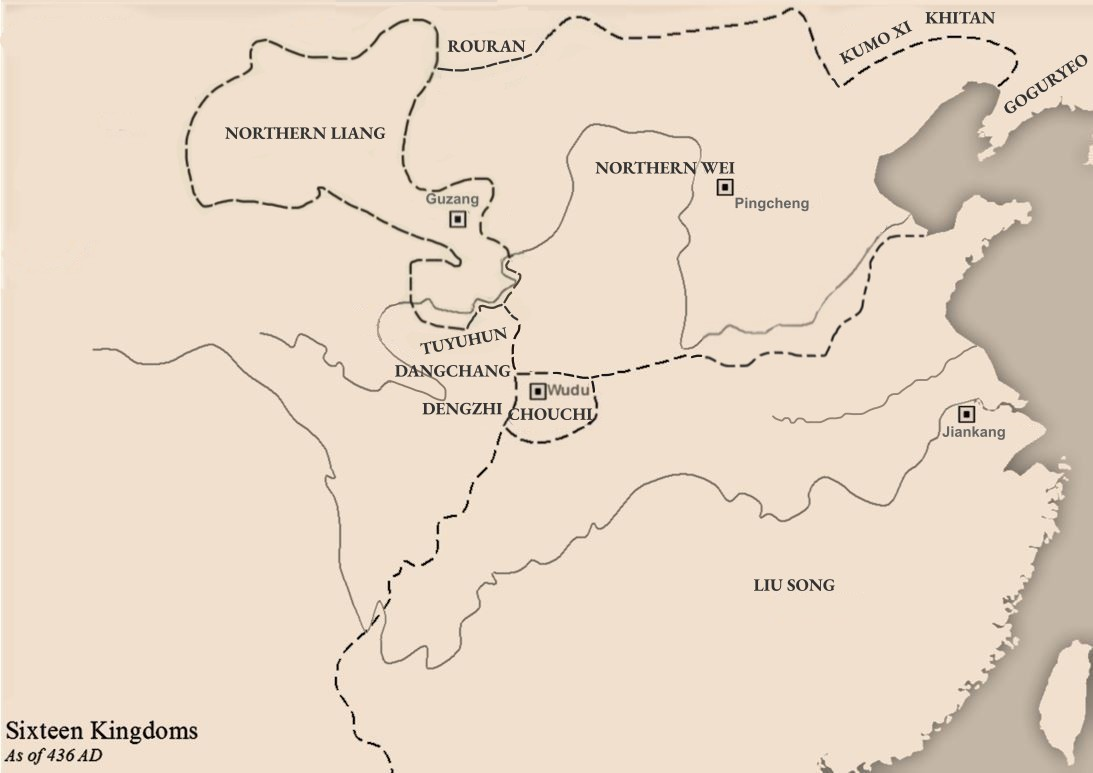
- The kingdom of Dengzhi in the western China
- Status: Kingdom
- Capital: Dengzhi
- Government: Monarchy
- King
- Historical era: 5th - 6th century
  - Established: 5th century
  - Disestablished: c. 554
Preceded by	Succeeded by
Qiang (historical people)	Western Wei; Tuyuhun
- Today part of: China

Dengzhi (Chinese: 鄧至), also known as the Dengzhi Qiang (鄧至羌) and Baishui Qiang (白水羌), was a state established by the Qiang ethnic group that existed during the Northern and Southern dynasties period in China. It was located west of Chouchi and south of Dangchang, which is equivalent to the northern part of present-day Sichuan, China. Its capital was Dengzhi City (west of modern day Jiuzhaigou County, Sichuan), and their rulers all had the surname "Xiang" (像/象).

== History ==
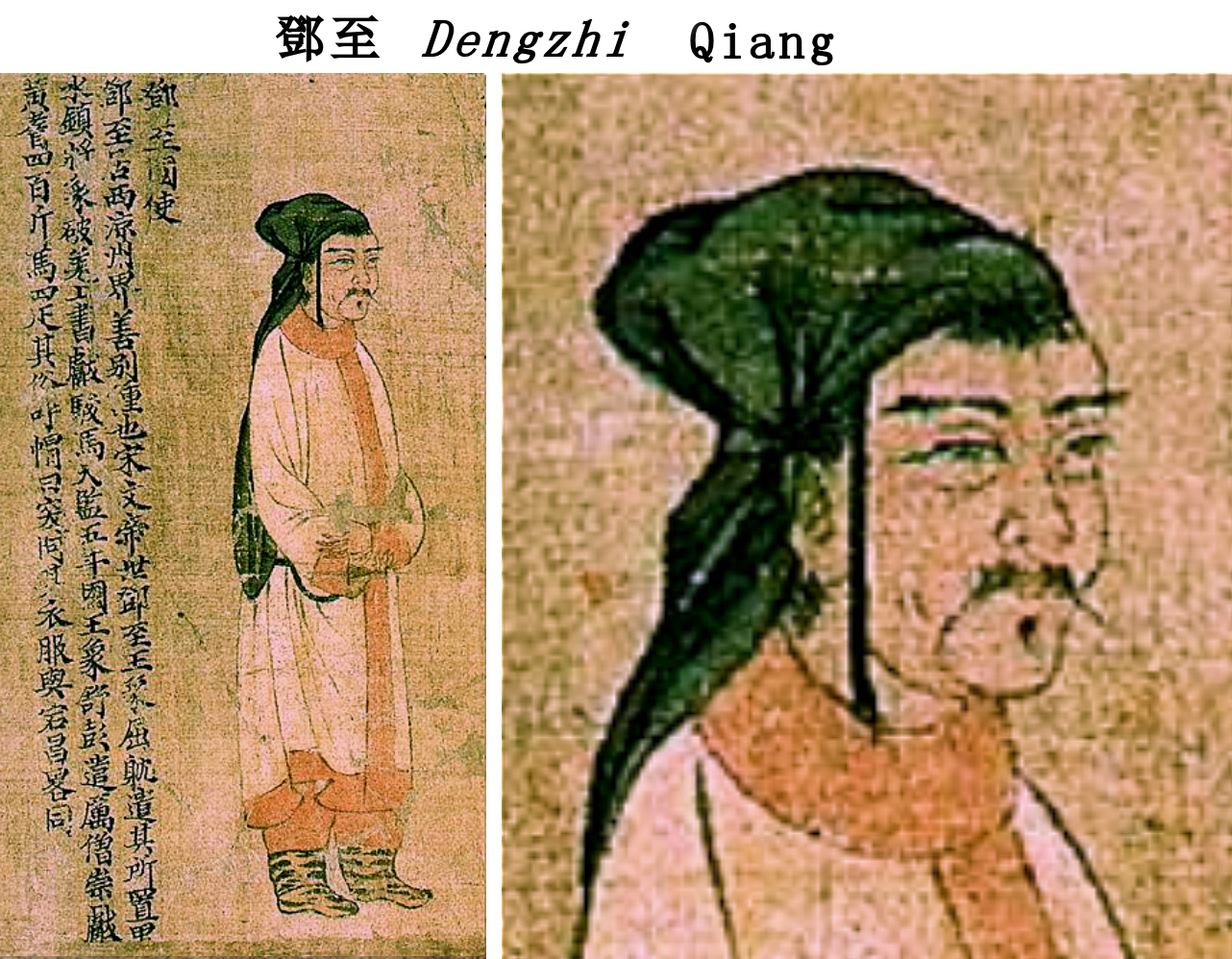
Depiction of an envoy of Dengzhi from a Portraits of Periodical Offering painting, 6th century CE

The kingdom of Dengzhi was first founded by Xiang Shuzhi, the chieftain of the Baishui tribe (白水; "White River") of the Qiang ethnic group who later proclaimed himself king. According to the 7th-century Book of Sui, the mountain which the Baishui resided on may have been named after the Cao Wei dynasty general, Deng Ai (197–264 CE), who once passed through the area during his conquest of the rival Shu Han state ("Deng" (鄧) being his surname, and "zhi" (至) being the Chinese word for "arrive"). Modern Chinese scholar, Liu Lin (刘琳), dimiss this claim as conjecture, and instead suggest that "Dengzhi" was a transliteration of "Diaodi" (甸氐), a Han-era county located within the White River valley.

The Dengzhi's earliest interaction with the Northern and Southern dynasties was during the reign of Emperor Wen of Song (424–453), when Xiang Qudan sent horses to the Liu Song dynasty as tribute. During the reign of Xiang Shupeng, he actively pursued diplomatic relations with the Southern Qi, Northern Wei and Liang dynasties, receiving various titles in return. In 509, Xiang Lanti ascended the throne, presumably succeeding Xiang Shupeng.

The Book of Liang records that the Dengzhi people wore hats called "Tuhe" (突何) and their clothes were similar to those of the Dangchang, a neighbouring Qiang kingdom to the north. Various historical records also record that Dengzhi's customs and habits were the same as Dangchang.

The last recorded ruler of the Dengzhi was Xiang Yanheng, who was the tenth descendant of Xiang Shuzhi. In 554, Xiang Yanheng lost power after his state was attacked by the Tuyuhun, causing him to flee to the Western Wei dynasty. The Western Wei paramount authority, Yuwen Tai sent troops to escort him back to his domain. Dengzhi's subsequent events are not recorded in historical records, but by the time the Northern Zhou dynasty replaced the Western Wei in 557, Deng province had been established in Dengzhi's place, meaning that the state would have likely ceased to exist around this time.

== Rulers ==
Common names in Chinese Characters	Duration of reigns
Xiang Shuzhi (像舒治)	Unknown
Xiang Qudan (像屈耽)	c. 424–453
Xiang Shupeng (像舒彭)	c. 479–509
Xiang Lanti (像覽蹄)	509–?
Xiang Yanheng (像檐桁)	?–554
