= Woo Hoo =

Woo Hoo, WooHoo, and spelling variants may refer to:

== Songs ==
- "Woo-Hoo" (Rock-A-Teens song), 1959
- "Woohoo" (Christina Aguilera song), 2010
- "Woo Hoo", the B-side from "Fans" by Kings of Leon
- "WooHoo", a song by Newsboys from Step Up to the Microphone
- "Woohoo", a 2014 song by Eli "Paperboy" Reed from his album Nights Like This
- "Woohoo", a song by South Korean girl group Twice from their album, Page Two
- "Song 2", a 1997 song by alternative rock band Blur that prominently features the phrase "Woo Hoo!" in the chorus
- "Windows Down", song by Big Time Rush originally titled "Woo Hoo"

== Other ==
- Whoo hoo, a marketing campaign by the bank Washington Mutual
- Woohoo, a 19th-century English name for the Hawaiian island of Oahu
- WooHoo, a game mechanic in The Sims franchise

== See also ==
- Wuhu (disambiguation)
- Woo (disambiguation)
- Wahoo (disambiguation)
