= Woo =

Woo, or variants, may refer to:

== People ==
- Wu (surname), Chinese surname and several variants and other transliterations
  - Wu (surname 伍)
  - Wu (surname 武)
  - Ng (name): 吳, 伍
- Hu (surname), also pronounced Woo
- Woo (Korean surname)
- Woo (Korean given name)
- Łukasz Obrzut, nicknamed Woo, Polish-American basketball player fl. 2003–2007
- Woo, name used by hip-hop artists:
  - Dafi Woo
  - General Woo
  - Jessie Woo

== Arts and entertainment ==
=== Fictional characters ===
- Woo, in King of the Monsters video games
- WoO, an alien creature in Japanese TV show Bio Planet WoO
- Woo, a fictional monster in the Ultraman television series

=== Film and television ===
- Woo (film), a 1998 romantic comedy
- "Woooo!", a 2008 TV episode of How I Met Your Mother
- "Woo-oo!", series premiere of 2017 TV series DuckTales

=== Music ===
- WoO (Works without opus number), a cataloging system for unnumbered works of Beethoven and others
- Woo (music group), a British experimental band
- Woo (soundtrack), from the 1998 film
- Woo!, a 2003 EP by Tilly and the Wall
- "Woo", a song by Rihanna from the 2016 album Anti
- "Woo", a song by Beach House from the 2018 album 7
- "The Woo", a 2020 song by Pop Smoke

== Other uses ==
- Woo, to engage in courtship
- World of Outlaws, or WoO, an American motorsports sanctioning body
- WOO, a callsign of the AT&T High Seas Service
- WOO (Philadelphia), a 1920s broadcasting station
- "Woooo!", a catchphrase of wrestler Ric Flair
- Wool railway station, Dorset, England, station code WOO
- The Woo (restaurant), a Korean restaurant in New York City, United States
- "Woo", slang for pseudoscience

== See also ==
- Wu (disambiguation)
- Woo Hoo (disambiguation)
- Woo Woo (disambiguation)
- The Wizard of Oz (disambiguation)
- Woo circles, a set of infinitely many Archimedean circles
- Woo! Yeah!, a drum break
- Worcester, Massachusetts, a city in the United States known as Woo-town or The Woo
- Wooster, Ohio, a city in the United States
  - College of Wooster
- Woozle effect, undeserved credibility for a source cited for a claim it does not adequately support
