= Woo Woo (disambiguation) =

A Woo Woo is an alcoholic beverage made of vodka, peach schnapps, and cranberry juice.

Woo Woo may also refer to:

- "Woo-Woo" (song), a boogie woogie song by Harry James and the Boogie Woogie Trio
- Ronnie Woo Woo Wickers (born 1941), a fan at Chicago Cubs baseball games
- Woowoo, a Caribbean drum
- "Woo-Woo", a song by Sheryl Crow on her 2017 album Be Myself

== See also ==
- "You Should Be Mine (The Woo Woo Song)", a 1986 song by Jeffrey Osborne from the album Emotional
- Kitchen Party (group), a British girl group formerly known as The WooWoos
- Woo (disambiguation)
