= Yahoo (disambiguation) =

Yahoo is a web services portal.

Yahoo may also refer to:

== Arts and entertainment ==
- Yahoo (Gulliver's Travels), creatures found in the book Gulliver's Travels by Jonathan Swift
- Yahoo, the name of the fictitious country which is the setting for Bertolt Brecht's 1936 play Round Heads and Pointed Heads
- Yahoo (band), a Brazilian rock band
- Yahoo! (song), a song from the 1988 album The Innocents by Erasure
- Yahoo (album), an Afghan album by Farhad Darya
- "Yahoo" or "Chahe Koi Mujhe Junglee Kahe", a song by Shankar-Jaikishan and Muhammad Rafi from the 1959 Indian film Junglee
- Yahoo Serious (born Greg Pead 1953), Australian filmmaker
- Yahoo+, a 2022 Nigerian crime film

== Animals ==
- Yahoo (bird), a popular name for the grey-crowned babbler
- Yahoo (horse), a successful National Hunt racehorse

== Companies ==
- Yahoo Software, an American company unrelated to the internet content provider
- Altaba, the remainder and direct legal successor of the original iteration of "Yahoo! Inc." company after selling off their Internet business and brand
- Yahoo! Japan

=== Yahoo! Inc. ===
- Yahoo! Inc. (1995–2017), the owner of Yahoo! until 2017 and the original incarnation of Yahoo! Inc.
- Yahoo! Inc. (2017–present), American technology company, parent company of the Yahoo! portal, and the current incarnation of Yahoo! Inc.

== Other uses ==
- Yahoo Falls, Kentucky, a historic waterfall
- Yahoo boy, a nickname for a Nigerian 419 scammer
- A Ku Klux Klan term used in its tribunal organisations
- A monster in Aboriginal Australian mythology, possibly the basis for the cryptid Yowie
