= Dangchang Kingdom =

State by the Qiang ethnic group

Dangchang 宕昌
- c. 4th century–564
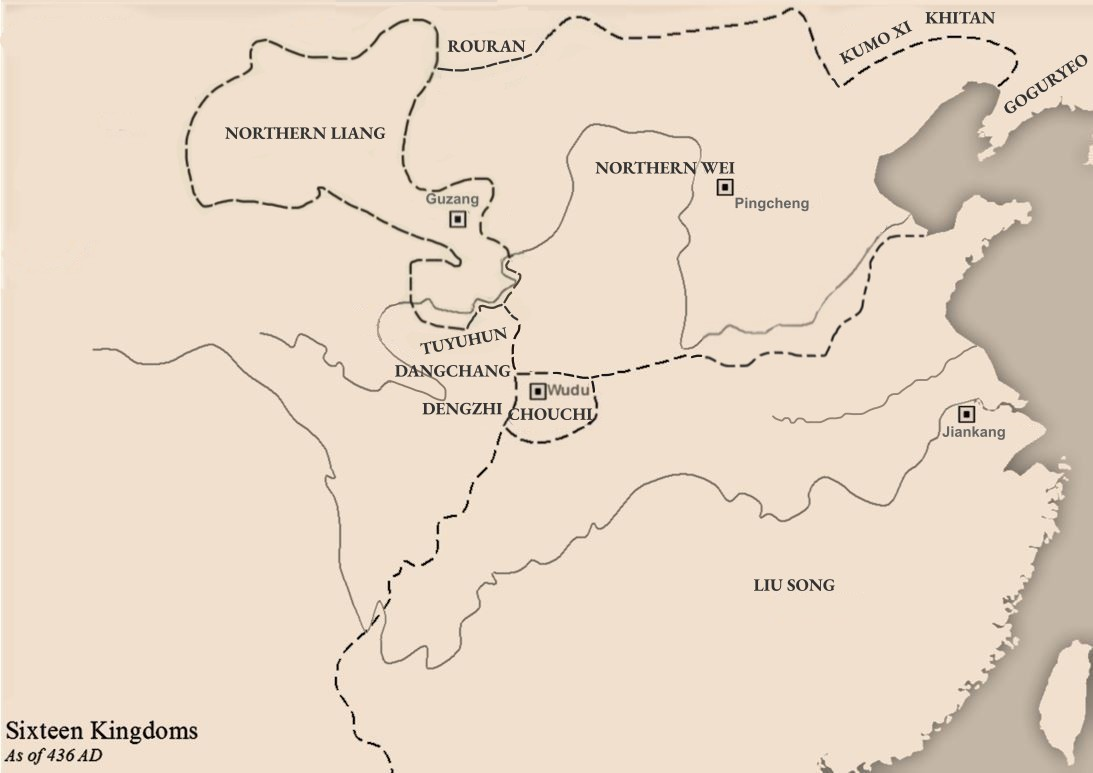
- The kingdom of Dangchang in western China
- Status: Kingdom
- Capital: Dangchang
- Government: Monarchy
- King
- Historical era: c. 4th century - 564
  - Established: c. 4th century
  - Disestablished: 564
Preceded by	Succeeded by
Qiang (historical people)	Northern Zhou
- Today part of: China

Dangchang (Chinese: 宕昌), also known as the Dangchang Qiang (宕昌羌), was a state established by the Qiang ethnic group that existed during the Northern and Southern dynasties period in China. Its area was equivalent to the southern part of present-day Gansu Province, China. Its capital was Dangchang City (now in the west of Tanchang County, Gansu). Their rulers had the surname of Liang (梁), and the first recorded leader in history was Liang Qin.

== History ==
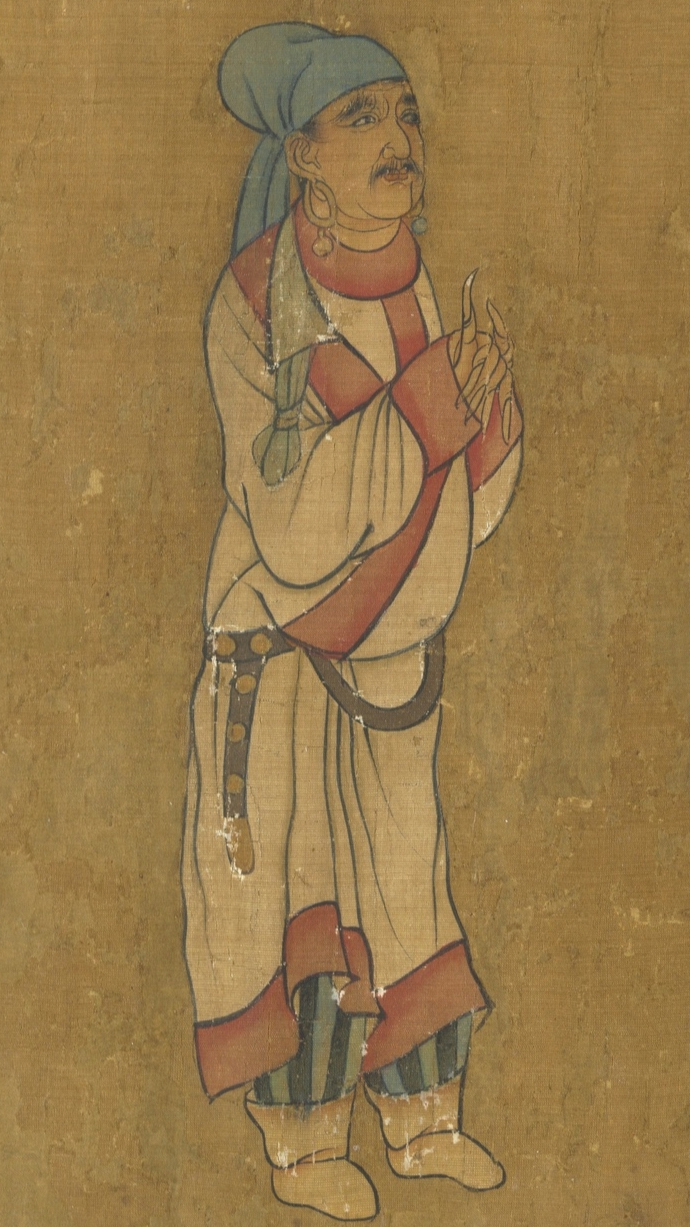
Depiction of an envoy of Dangchang from a Portraits of Periodical Offering painting, 6th century CE

Modern Chinese scholars generally believe that the Dangchang people were a branch of an older Qiang tribe known as the Canlang (参狼). The Canlang claimed descent from the legendary Qiang chieftain, Wuyi Yuanjian and were mainly distributed in present-day Wudu, Gansu Province along the Bailong River, where the Dangchang Kingdom was situated.

Prior to becoming a unified polity, the Book of Wei and Book of Zhou states that the Dangchang region had been home to various different Qiang tribes, each led by their own chieftain. These tribes rarely interacted with each other, only doing so in times of war, and there were no laws and corvées. Their people raised yaks, cattle and pigs to provide themselves with food, living in houses covered with woven yak tails and goat wool and wearing fur and brown clothing. They did not have a written language, but did record the years by waiting for the growth and fall of plants and trees. Every three years, they would kill cattle and sheep as sacrifices to the sky. When their married men died, their wives were taken by their stepfathers, uncles, brothers or brothers-in-law for themselves.

A chieftain, Liang Qin later won the support of the Qiang nobles and unified the Dangchang Qiang, taking the title of king. The first recorded interaction between Dangchang and the neighbouring Northern and Southern dynasties was in 424, when Liang Mihu, grandson of Liang Qin, sent a petition to the Northern Wei offering his submission. To the west of them, Dangchang was threatened by the Tuyuhun of modern Qinghai. The Dangchang rulers paid tribute to the Northern Wei and the Southern dynasties of Liu Song, Southern Qi and Liang for titles and protection. According to the Book of Qi, tiger skin was a commodity in Dangchang at the time, as their people used them in funeral ceremonies.

In the 6th century, as the Northern Wei collapsed and split into two, Dangchang became more hostile as they allied with the Tuyuhun to carry out regular attacks on Northern Wei and then the Western Wei. While they were willing to resubmit after each defeat, the Northern Zhou, successor of the Western Wei, eventually launched a campaign to finally conquer Dangchang after their ruler Liang Miding repeatedly raided their territory in 564. Dangchang fell that same year, and Dang province was set up in its place.

== Rulers ==
Common names in Chinese Characters	Duration of reigns
Liang Qin (梁勤)	Unknown
Liang Mihu (梁彌忽)	c. 424
Liang Huzi (梁虎子)	Unknown
Liang Mizhi (梁彌治)	?–478
Liang Miji (梁彌機)	478–485
Liang Mibo I (梁彌博)	485
Liang Mixie (梁彌頡)	485–488
Liang Micheng (梁彌承)	488–?
Liang Mihe (梁彌頜)	?–502
Liang Miyong (梁彌邕)	502–?
Liang Mibo II (梁彌博)	c. 505
Liang Mitai (梁彌泰)	Unknown
Liang Xianding (梁仚定)	?–541
Liang Miding (梁彌定)	541–550 and 550–564
Liang Liaogan (梁獠甘)	550
