= List of state leaders in the 1st century =

This is a list of state leaders in the 1st century (1–100 AD).

== Africa ==
=== Africa: East ===
Ethiopia

- Kingdom of Aksum (complete list) –

- Zoskales, King (c.100)

=== Africa: Northeast ===
Nubia

- Kush (complete list) –

- Natakamani, King (c.1 BC–c.20 AD)
- Amanitore, Queen Co-regent (c.1 BC–?)
- Shorkaror, King (c.20–30)
- Pisakar, King (mid 1st century)
- Amanitaraqide, King (mid 1st century)
- Amanitenmemide, King (mid 1st century)
- Amanikhatashan, Queen Regent (c.62–c.85)
- Teritnide, King (late 1st century)

=== Africa: Northwest ===
Morocco

- Mauretania (complete list) –

- Juba II, client King under Rome (25 BC–23 AD)
- Ptolemy, client King under Rome (20–40)

== Americas ==
=== Americas: Mesoamerica ===
Maya civilization

- Tikal (complete list) –

- Yax Ehb Xook, Ajaw (c.90)

== Asia ==
=== Asia: Central ===
Mongolia

- Xianbei state –

- Bianhe, Chieftain (c.49)
- Yuchoupen, Chieftain (c.54)

- Xiongnu Empire

- Wuzhuliu, Chanyu (c.8 BC-13 AD)
- Wulei, Chanyu (c.13-18)
- Huduershidaogao, Chanyu (c.18-46)
- Wudadihou, Chanyu (c.46)
- Punu, Chanyu (c.46-?)

- Northern Xiongnu

- Punu, Chanyu (c.46-?)
- Youliu, Chanyu (?-87)
- Northern Chanyu, Chanyu (c.89-91)
- Yuchujian, Chanyu (c.91-93)
- Fenghou, Chanyu (93-94)

- Southern Xiongnu

- Sutuhu, Chanyu (c.48-56)
- Qiufu Youdi, Chanyu (c.56-57)
- Yifa Yulüdi, Chanyu (c.57-59)
- Xitong Shizhu Houdi, Chanyu (c.59-63)
- Qiuchu Julindi, Chanyu (c.63)
- Huxie Shizhu Houdi, Chanyu (c.63-85)
- Yitu Yulüdi, Chanyu (c.85-88)
- Tuntuhe, Chanyu (c.88-93)
- Anguo, Chanyu (c.93-94)
- Shizi, Chanyu (c.94-98)
- Wanshishizhudi, Chanyu (c.98-124)

=== Asia: East ===
China

- Western Han, China (complete list) –

- Ping, Emperor (1 BC–5 AD)
- Ruzi Ying, Emperor (6–8)

- Xin dynasty, China –

- Wang Mang, Emperor (9–23)

- Eastern Han, China (complete list) –

- Gengshi, Emperor (23–25)
- Guangwu, Emperor (25–57)
- Ming, Emperor (58–75)
- Zhang, Emperor (76–88)
- He, Emperor (89–105)

Korea

- Baekje (complete list) –

- Onjo, King (18 BC–28 AD)
- Daru, King (28–77)
- Giru, King (77–128)

- Dongbuyeo (complete list) –

- Daeso, King (7 BC–22 AD)

- Goguryeo (complete list) –

- Yuri, King (19 BC–18 AD)
- Daemusin, King (18–44)
- Minjung, King (44–48)
- Mobon, King (48–53)
- Taejodae, King (53–146)

- Silla (complete list) –

- Hyeokgeose, King (57 BC–4 AD)
- Namhae, King (4–24)
- Yuri, King (24–57)
- Talhae, King (57–80)
- Pasa, King (80–112)

=== Asia: Southeast ===
Cambodia

- Funan –

- Soma, Queen (late 1st century)
- Hùntián, King (1st/2nd century)

Vietnam

- Lĩnh Nam (complete list) –
  - Trưng Trắc, Queen (40–43); Trưng Nhị, Vicereine (40–43)
- Jiaozhi

- Ma Yuan, Jiaozhi's governor (43-45)
- Lý Thiện, Jiaozhi's governor (45 - ?, under emperor Ming)
- Trương Khôi, Jiaozhi's governor (?, under emperor Ming)
- Hồ Cống, Jiaozhi's commandant (?, under emperor Zhang)

=== Asia: South ===
India

- Indo-Greek Kingdom (complete list) –

- Strato II and Strato III, Kings of Eastern Punjab (25 BC–10 AD)

- Kushan Empire (complete list) –

- Heraios, Clan chief (c.1–c.30)
- Kujula Kadphises, Ruler/Emperor (c.30–c.80)
- Vima Takto, Ruler/Emperor (c.80–c.95)
- Vima Kadphises, Ruler/Emperor (c.95–c.127)

- Satavahana dynasty (Purana-based chronology) –

- Satakarni III, King (1 BC–1 AD)
- Pulumavi I, King (1–36)
- Gaura Krishna, King (36–61)
- Hāla, King (61–66)
- Mandalaka a.k.a. Puttalaka or Pulumavi II, King (69–71)
- Purindrasena, King (71–76)
- Sundara Satakarni, King (76–77)
- Chakora Satakarni, King (77–78)
- Shivasvati, King (78–106)

- Northern Satraps (complete list) –

- Rajuvula, Great Satrap (c.10–25)
- Bhadayasa, Satrap (early 1st century)
- Sodasa, Satrap (early 1st century)

- Western Satraps (complete list) –

- Abhiraka, Satrap (1st century)

Pakistan

- Apracharajas (complete list) –

- Vijayamitra, Raja (12 BC–15 AD)
- Indravasu, Raja (c.15)
- Vispavarma, Raja (c.5/6–20)
- Aspavarman, Raja (c.15–45)
- Sasan, Raja (c.45–50)

- Indo-Parthian Kingdom (complete list) –

- Sarpedones, King (c.19–20)
- Gondophares, King (c.19–46)
- Gadana, King (46–55)
- Abdagases I, King (46–60)
- Sases, King (mid 1st-century)
- Ubouzanes, King (late 1st-century)
- Pacores, King (100–135)

- Indo-Scythians (complete list) –

- Zeionises, Sub-king (c.10 BC–10 AD)
- Kharahostes, Sub-king (c.10 BC–10 AD)

Sri Lanka

- Anuradhapura Kingdom (complete list) –

- Bhatikabhaya Abhaya, King (20 BC–9 AD)
- Mahadathika Mahanaga, King (9–21 AD)
- Amandagamani Abhaya, King (21–30)
- Kanirajanu Tissa, King (30–33)
- Chulabhaya, King (33–35)
- Sivali, King (35–35)
- Ilanaga, King (38–44)
- Chandamukha, King (44–52)
- Yassalalaka Tissa, King (52–60)
- Subharaja, King (60–66)
- Vasabha, King (66–110)

=== Asia: West ===
- Commagene (complete list) –

- Antiochus III, King (12 BC–17 AD)
- Antiochus IV, King (38–72)

- Nabataean kingdom (complete list) –

- Aretas IV Philopatris, King (9/8 BC–39/40 AD)
- Malichus II, King (39/40–69/70)
- Rabbel II Soter, King (70/71–106)

- Osroene (complete list) –

- Abgar V, King (4 BC–7 AD, 13–50)
- Ma'nu IV, King (7–13 AD)
- Ma'nu V, King (50–57)
- Ma'nu VI, King (57–71)
- Abgar VI, King (71–91)
- Sanatruk, King (91–109)

- Parthian Empire (complete list) –

- Musa, Great Queen, Shah (2 BC–4 AD)
- Phraates V, Great King, Shah (2 BC–4 AD)
- Orodes III, Great King, Shah (4–6)
- Vonones I, Great King, Shah (6–12)
- Artabanus II, Great King, Shah (10–35)
- Tiridates III, Great King, Shah (35–36)
- Artabanus II, Great King, Shah (36–38)
- Vardanes I, Great King, Shah (40–47)
- Gotarzes II, Great King, Shah (40–51)
- Vonones II, Great King, Shah (51)
- Vologases I, Great King, Shah (51–78)
- Vardanes II, Great King, Shah (55–58)
- Vologases II, Great King, Shah (77–80)
- Pacorus II, Great King, Shah (78–105)
- Artabanus III, Great King, Shah (79/80–81)

- Adiabene (complete list) –

- Izates I, client King under Parthia (?–20s AD)
- Monobaz I, client King under Parthia (20s–c.36)
- Heleni, Queen (c.30–c.58)
- Izates bar Monobaz, client King under Parthia (c.36–55/59)
- Vologases I, a Parthian rebel opposing Izates II (c.50)
- Monobaz II, client King under Parthia (55/59–late 60s/mid-70s)
- Meharaspes, client King under Parthia (?–116)

- Characene (complete list) –

- Attambelos II, client King under Parthia (c.17/16 BC–8/9 AD)
- Abinergaos I, client King under Parthia (10/11–22/23)
- Orabazes I, client King under Parthia (c.19)
- Attambelos III, client King under Parthia (c.37/38–44/45)
- Theonesios II, client King under Parthia (c.46/47)
- Theonesios III, client King under Parthia (c.52/53)
- Attambelos IV, client King under Parthia (54/55–64/65)
- Attambelos V, client King under Parthia (64/65–73/74)
- Orabazes II, client King under Parthia (c.73–80)
- Pakoros II, client King under Parthia (80–101/02)

- Elymais (complete list) –

- Kamnaskires VII, client King under Parthia (c.28 BC–c.1 AD)
- Kamnaskires VIII, client King under Parthia (c.1–c.15 AD)
- Kamnaskires IX, client King under Parthia (c.15–c.25)
- Orodes I, client King under Parthia (c.25–c.50)
- Orodes II, client King under Parthia (c.50–c.70)
- Phraates, client King under Parthia (c.70–c.90)
- Orodes III, client King under Parthia (c.90–c.100)
- Kamnaskires-Orodes, client King under Parthia (c.100–c.120)

- Siraces –

- Zorsines, King (fl. 41–49)

Roman Asia

- Cappadocia (complete list) –

- Archelaus, client King under Rome (36 BC–17 AD)

- Judea: Herodian dynasty (complete list) –

- Herod the Great, client King under Rome (37–4 BC)
- Herod Archelaus, client Ethnarch of Judaea under Rome (4 BC–6 AD)
- Herod Antipas, client Tetrarch of Galilee under Rome (4 BC–39 AD)
- Philip the Tetrarch (or Herod Philip II), client Tetrarch of Iturea, Trachonitis, and Batanaea under Rome (4 BC–34 AD)
- Salome I, client Toparch of Jabneh under Rome (4 BC–10 AD)
- Herod Agrippa I

- client King of Batanaea under Rome (37–41)
- client King of Galilee under Rome (40–41)
- client King of all Judaea under Rome (41–44)

- Herod of Chalcis, client Tetrarch of Chalcis under Rome (41–48)
- Herod Agrippa II

- client Tetrarch of Chalcis under Rome (48–53)
- client Tetrarch of Batanaea under Rome (53–c.92)

- Aristobulus of Chalcis

- Client king of Armenia Minor under Rome (55–72)
- Client tetrarch of Chalcis under Rome (57–92)

- Pontus (complete list) –

- Pythodorida, client queen under Rome (8 BC–38 AD)
- Polemon II, client King under Rome (38–64)

== Europe ==
=== Europe: Balkans ===
- Bosporan Kingdom (complete list) –

- Aspurgus, client king under Rome (8 BC–38 AD)
- Polemon II, client king under Rome (38–41)
- Rhescuporis I (?), client king under Rome (14–42)
- Mithridates III, client king under Rome (42–46)
- Cotys I, client king under Rome (46–78)
  - Incorporated as a part of the Roman Province of Moesia Inferior (63–68)
- Rhescuporis II, client king under Rome (78–93)
- Sauromates I, client king under Rome (93–123)

- Dacia (complete list) –

- Comosicus, King (44 BC–28 AD)
- Scorilo, King (c.28–68 AD)
- Duras, King (68–87)
- Decebalus, King (87–106)

- Odrysian kingdom of Thrace (complete list) –

- Rhoemetalces I, client King of Thrace under Rome (12 BC–12 AD)
- Rhescuporis II, client King of western Thrace under Rome (12–19)
- Cotys III, client King of eastern Thrace under Rome (12–18)
- Rhoemetalces II, client King of Thrace under Rome (19–38)
- Rhoemetalces III, client King of Thrace under Rome (38–46)

=== Europe: British Isles ===
- Brigantes –

- Cartimandua, Queen (43–69)
- Venutius, King (?–c.52, 69–?)
- Vellocatus, King (c.52–c.69)

- Cantiaci –

- Vodenos, King (?–15)
- Eppillus, King (15–?)

- Catuvellauni (complete list) –

- Tasciovanus, King (c.20 BC–9 AD)
- Cunobelinus, King (9–40 AD)
- Togodumnus, King (?–43)
- Caratacus, King (?–c.50)

- Corieltauvi –

- Volisios, King (c.45)
- Dumnocoveros, Sub-king under Volisios (c.45)
- Dubnovellaunus, Sub-king under Volisios (c.45)
- Cartivelios, Sub-king under Volisios (c.45)

- Iceni –

- Can, King (?–25)
- Antedios, King (25–40s)
- Prasutagus, King (47–60)
- Boudica, Queen (60–61)

- Regni –

- Tiberius Claudius Cogidubnus, King (43–?)

=== Europe: Central ===
- Marcomanni (complete list) –

- Maroboduus, King (9 BC–19 AD)

=== Europe: Southcentral ===
- Roman Empire: Principate (complete list) –

- Augustus/ Octavian, Principate, Emperor (27 BC–14 AD)
- Tiberius, Principate, Emperor (14–37)
- Gaius "Caligula", Emperor (37–41)
- Claudius, Emperor (41–54)
- Nero, Emperor (54–68)
- Galba, Emperor (68–69)
- Otho, Emperor (69)
- Vitellius, Emperor (69)
- Vespasian, Emperor (69–79)
- Titus, Emperor (79–81)
- Domitian, Emperor (81–96)
- Nerva, Emperor (96–98)
- Trajan, Emperor (98–117)

- See also: List of Roman consuls

=== Europe: West ===
- Atrebates (complete list) –

- Tincomarus, client King of Thrace under Rome (c.20 BC–7 AD)
- Eppillus, client King of Thrace under Rome (8–15)
- Verica, client King of Thrace under Rome (15–40)

- Batavians –

- Gaius Julius Civilis, Leader (?–c.70)

=== Eurasia: Caucasus ===
- Armenia (complete list) –

- Ariobarzanes II, client King under Rome (2 BC–4 AD)
- Artavasdes III, client King under Rome (4–6)
- Tigranes V, client King under Rome (6–12)
- Interregnum under Parthia
- Artaxias III, client King under Rome (18–35)
- Arsaces I, client King under Parthia (35)
- Orodes, client King under Parthia (35, 37–42)
- Mithridates, client King under Rome (35–37, 42–51)
- Rhadamistus, client King under Rome (51–53, 53–54)
- Tiridates I, client King under Rome (53)

- Iberia (Kartli) (complete list) –

- Arshak II, King (20 BC–1 AD)
- Pharasmanes I, the Great, King (1–58 AD)
- Mihrdat I, King (58–106)

== See also ==
- List of political entities in the 1st century
