= Xieguini =

Xianbei tribal chief

- Traditional Chinese: 泄歸泥
- Simplified Chinese: 泄归泥
Transcriptions
Standard Mandarin
- Hanyu Pinyin: Xièguīní
- Wade–Giles: hsiehkueini

Xieguini (fl. 218–233) was a Xianbei chieftain who lived during the late Eastern Han dynasty and Three Kingdoms period of China. He was the great-grandson of Tanshihuai.

== Life ==
Xieguini was the son of the Xianbei chieftain, Fuluohan. In 218, his father was betrayed and killed by a rival chieftain, Kebineng, who then annexed his tribe. Despite killing his father, Xieguini was treated well by Kebineng. His uncle, Budugen went to war with Kebineng, and eventually, he sent a messenger to Xieguini persuading him to defect. In response, Xieguini and his tribespeople fled to Budugen, and Kebineng was unable to stop him.

In 228, the Cao Wei dynasty sent an interpreter, Xia She (夏舎) to visit Kebineng's son-in-law, Yuzhujian (鬱築鞬). When Yuzhujian killed Xia She, the Colonel Protector of the Xianbei, Tian Yu led the western Xianbei tribes under Xieguini and Putou (蒲頭) out of the Great Wall to attack and defeated him.

After years of fighting, Budugen finally agreed to an alliance with Kebineng against the Wei. Xieguini joined Kebineng to raid Bing Province, killing many local officials and citizens. However, when the Wei emperor, Cao Rui sent his general, Qin Lang to fight them, Xieguini brought his people to surrender to Wei. He was named the King of Guiyi (歸義王) and given banners, flags and drums. He was also allowed to reside in Bing Province as before.

== See also ==
- Lists of people of the Three Kingdoms
