= Tanshihuai =

2nd century chieftain of the Xianbei State

Tanshihuai 檀石槐
- Daren
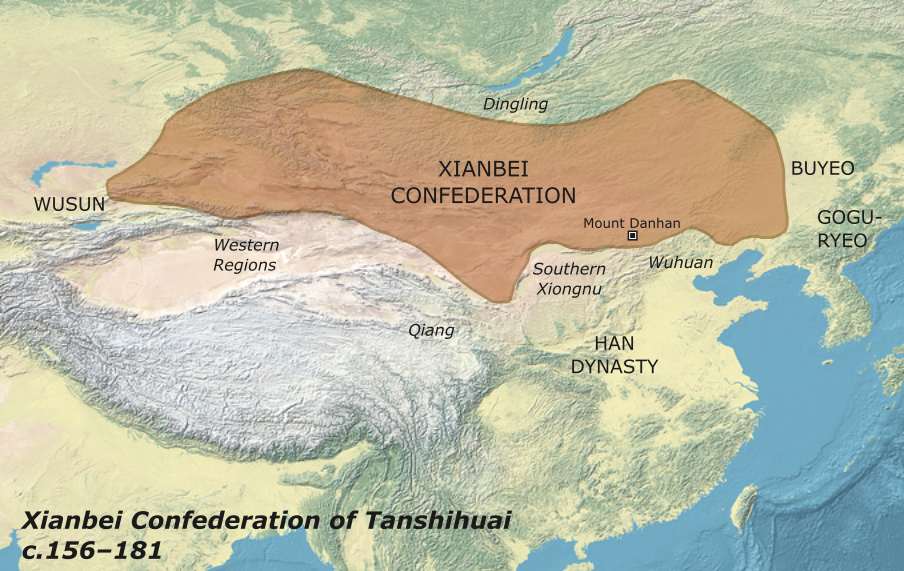
- The Xianbei confederation under Tanshihuai

Daren of the Xianbei Confederation
- Reign: c. 156–181
- Successor: Helian
- Born: 137
- Died: 181 (age 45 by East Asian age reckoning)
- Father: Touluhou

Tanshihuai (137–181) was a Xianbei chieftain who lived during the late Eastern Han dynasty period of China. Under Tanshihuai the Xianbei became a unified polity and posed a constant threat to the Han dynasty's northern borders for many years. After his death, however, his state quickly fell apart as his grandsons failed to maintain the support of the tribes.

== Life ==
=== Early life and rise ===
Tanshihuai's mother was the wife of a man named Touluhou (投鹿侯). While Touluhou was serving in the Xiongnu army for three years, his wife gave birth to him at home. When he returned, Touluhou believed Tanshihuai was the product of an affair and wanted to kill him before his wife intervened. She claimed that while she was out, she had heard the sound of a thunderstorm. When she looked up, a piece of hail fell into her mouth, and she became pregnant with Tanshihuai after she swallowed it. Although Touluhou did not believe her, he decided not to kill him, only forcing her to send him away. The wife secretly gave Tanshihuai to her parents for them to raise.

As Tanshihuai was growing up, he was described as brave, strong and resourceful. At the age of 14 or 15, a leader from a different tribe stole his grandfather's cattles and horses. On horseback, Tanshihuai chased them down and recovered all the stolen animals, which made him renowned among his people. As an adult, his laws and judgements were fair, and his followers did not object to them, so he was elected to as their daren (大人; "elder"). He moved his base to Mount Danhan (彈汗山; in present-day Shangyi County, Hebei), where he built a court on the banks of the Jieqiu River (歠仇水).

Tanshihuai's soldiers and horses were strong, and many of the tribes in the east and west submitted to him. He conducted raids on the Han dynasty's borders and blocked the Dingling's encroachment from the north. He also repelled Buyeo's attacks from the east and attacked the Wusun in the west. His territory was comparable to the former Xiongnu empire, covering more than 14,000 li from east to west and 7,000 li from north to south including mountains, rivers, swamps and salt lakes.

=== War with the Han dynasty ===
In 156, Tanshihuai led around three to four thousand cavalry to invade the Han dynasty's Yunzhong Commandery. He led more attacks on the Han's northern borders in 158, 159 and 163. In 166, the Xianbei allied with the Southern Xiongnu and Wuhuan to attack nine border commanderies, plundering them and killing many of the local officials and people. The Han sent the general, Zhang Huan, to attack them, and the Xianbei withdrew from the border fortresses. Fearing their inability to restrain him, the Han sent their envoys with official seals and ribbons to Tanshihuai, offering him the title of king in hopes of reaching a peace agreement. However, Tanshihuai rejected them and intensified his intrusion.

Tanshihuai divided his domain into three sections; from Youbeiping to the east up to Liaodong, encompassing over twenty cities including the Buyeo and Yemaek tribes, formed the eastern part. From Youbeiping to the west up to Shanggu, including over ten cities, formed the central part. From Shanggu to the west up to Dunhuang and the Wusun, including over twenty cities, formed the western part. Each section was governed by a chieftain appointed by Tanshihuai, who swore fealty to him.

During the reign of Emperor Ling of Han, the Xianbei attacked the border commanderies of You, Bing and Liang provinces, leaving countless dead and devastating the regions. In 177, the Han launched a counterattack on the Xianbei. They sent the generals Xia Yu, Tian Yan and Zang Min, along with the Southern Xiongnu chanyu, Tute Ruoshi Zhujiu to venture beyond the Great Wall. The Han army marched over 2,000 li before facing Tanshihuai in battle and were defeated. Only one-tenth of the Han army returned safely, and later that winter, the Xianbei raided Liaoxi.

In 178, the Xianbei raided Jiuquan Commandery. At the time, the Xianbei population had grown to the point that farming, herding and hunting alone could not longer sustain them. Therefore, Tanshihuai went to the Wuhouqin River (烏侯秦水; modern-day Laoha River, Liaoning) to promote fishing, but initially had no success. Hearing that the Han people (汗人, not to be confused with 漢人 Han people) were excellent fishers, he led his cavalry to attack them in the east and captured thousands of them. He relocated them to live along the Wuhouqin River to fish for the Xianbei and alleviate their food shortage. While the earlier Records of the Three Kingdoms refer to these captured people as "Han people", the later Book of the Later Han refers to them as "Wa people" (倭人), with "Wa" being an old term for Japan. K. H. J. Gardiner and Rafe de Crespigny reason that it is feasible that "Han people" refers to the people of Panhan county (番汗縣) in Liaodong Commandery, which was well within Tanshihuai's area of influence, and the far-fetched suggestion that Tanshihuai invaded Japan by sea could hardly be considered when the Xianbei at the time could not effectively fish for themselves.

=== Death and descendants ===
Tanshihuai died at the age of 45 (by East Asian age reckoning) in 181 and was succeeded by his son, Helian, signifying an attempt at shifting away from the elective-based system of succession to a hereditary system. However, in the coming decades, the vast state that Tanshihuai had built would quickly fall apart. Around 189, Helian was killed during a raid on Han, and the chieftains acclaimed his nephew, Kuitou as his successor since his son, Qianman, was too young. Once Qianman became of age, however, he challenged Kuitou's succession and caused many of the Xianbei chieftains to break away. Following Kuitou's death, his domain was divided between his brothers, Budugen and Fuluohan, but by 233, they were both killed by a rival chieftain, Kebineng. That same year, Fuluohan's son, Xieguini, surrendered to the Cao Wei dynasty and was resettled in Bing province, though what became of him afterwards is unknown.

== Family tree ==
Family tree of Tanshihuai

Touluhou 投鹿侯
Tanshihuai 檀石槐 b.137–d.181 r. 156?–181
Helian 和連 d. 189? r. 181–189?	□
Qianman 騫曼	Kuitou 魁頭 r. 189?–207?	Budugen 步度根 d. 233 r. 207?–233	Fuluohan 扶羅韓 d. 218
Xieguini 泄歸泥
