= Qin Lang =

3rd century Cao Wei general

- 秦朗

General of Valiant Cavalry (驍騎將軍)
- In office 227 – 238
- Monarch: Cao Rui

Personal details
- Born: Unknown
- Died: Unknown
- Children: Qin Xiu
- Parents: Qin Yilu (father); Lady Du (mother)
- Occupation: General
- Courtesy name: Yuanming (元明)
- Childhood name: "Ah-su" (阿穌)

Qin Lang (fl.199 – 238), courtesy name Yuanming, was a military general of the state of Cao Wei during the Three Kingdoms period of China.

== Family background ==
Qin Lang was born in the late Eastern Han dynasty and his ancestral home was in Xinxing Commandery (新興郡; around present-day Xinzhou, Shanxi). His father was Qin Yilu, a former subordinate of Lü Bu, a warlord who lived in the late Eastern Han dynasty. His mother was Qin Yilu's ex-wife, Lady Du (杜氏), who was taken by the warlord Cao Cao as a concubine after Lü Bu's defeat and death at the Battle of Xiapi in 198-199. At a young age, Qin Lang accompanied his mother and joined Cao Cao's household. Cao Cao adopted Qin Lang as a son and doted on him. Once, during a banquet, Cao Cao told his guests, "Would someone love his foster son (referring to Qin Lang) in the same way as I do?"

Due to his mother's second marriage, Qin Lang's half-siblings include Cao Gun, Cao Lin (Prince of Pei) and Princess Gaocheng. (Note: It is possible that Lady Du has another daughter, Princess Jinxiang. The Wei Mo Zhuan (魏末傳) claimed that Princess Jinxiang was He Yan's half-sister and that she was born to the same mother as the Prince of Pei (Cao Lin). Pei Songzhi pointed out that the Sanguozhi stated that Cao Lin's mother was Lady Du. He Yan's mother was Lady Yin. Therefore, if Princess Jinxiang shared the same mother as Cao Lin, she could not have been He Yan's half-sister. Also, it is unknown if Princess Jinxiang was the same person as the Princess Gaocheng recorded in Weilüe.)

== During Cao Rui's reign ==
When Qin Lang grew up, he travelled around China and did not take up any appointments in the civil service or in the military. After Cao Cao's death in 220 CE, he remained in the state of Cao Wei – founded by Cao Cao's son and successor, Cao Pi – during the Three Kingdoms period. In 227, after Cao Rui, Cao Pi's son, ascended the Wei throne upon the death of his father, Qin Lang was appointed General of Valiant Cavalry (驍騎將軍) and Official Who Concurrently Serves in the Palace (給事中), and he constantly accompanied Cao Rui on his tours. During his reign, Cao Rui liked to pick on people's wrongdoings, and many people who committed minor offences were executed by him. Qin Lang never advised Cao Rui against his ways, nor did he recommend any talents to the Wei imperial court, but he was still nonetheless deeply favoured by the emperor, who often consulted him and called him by his childhood name "Ah-su" (阿穌). Cao Rui also showered gifts on Qin Lang and even had a large residence constructed in the capital Luoyang for the latter. Other officials were aware that Qin Lang was not much of a capable and talented person, but they knew that he was close to the emperor Cao Rui, so they often bribed him and attempted to curry favour with him. In return, Qin Lang used his status and close relationship with Cao Rui to help these officials get promotions and even titles of nobility.

In the autumn of 233, the Xianbei chieftain Budugen, who had previously surrendered to Wei, rebelled and collaborated with another Xianbei leader Kebineng. Bi Gui, the Inspector of Bing Province in Wei, led an army from his province to attack the Xianbei but was defeated. Budugen and Kebineng became more united after that and they constantly raided Wei's northeastern borders. Cao Rui ordered Qin Lang to lead another army from the capital to attack the Xianbei, and Qin succeeded in driving the enemy far into the deserts in the north. By winter, Budugen's subordinates had surrendered to Qin Lang in Bing Province, so Qin and his army returned to Luoyang.

In late 238, Cao Rui became seriously ill, and he wanted to appoint Cao Yu, Xiahou Xian (夏侯獻), Cao Shuang, Cao Zhao (曹肇) and Qin Lang to help him administer state affairs in his absence. Xiahou Xian and others had disagreements with the ministers Liu Fang (劉放) and Sun Zi (孫資), so Liu Fang and Sun Zi managed to persuade Cao Rui to change his decision. Cao Rui then appointed Cao Shuang and Sima Yi as the regents instead, while Qin Lang and the others were dismissed from office.

== Descendants ==
Qin Lang's son, Qin Xiu (秦秀), was known for being a sturdy, strict and outspoken person. He served as an Academician (博士) in the Imperial University (太學) during the reign of Emperor Wu of the Jin dynasty after the end of the Three Kingdoms period.

== See also ==
- Cao Wei family trees#Lady Du
- Lists of people of the Three Kingdoms

== Sources ==
- Chen, Shou (3rd century). Records of the Three Kingdoms (Sanguozhi).
- Pei, Songzhi (5th century). Annotated Records of the Three Kingdoms (Sanguozhi zhu).
- Sima, Guang (1084). Zizhi Tongjian, Volume 72.
