= Wuyuan =

Wuyuan may refer to:

== Locations in China ==
- Wuyuan County, Jiangxi (婺源县)
- Wuyuan County, Inner Mongolia (五原县)
- Wuyuan Commandery (五原郡) of ancient China
- Wuyuan, Shanxi (吾元), a town in Tunliu County, Shanxi
- Wuyuan Subdistrict (武原街道), a subdistrict in Haiyan County, Zhejiang

== See also ==
- Qifu Gangui (died 412), formally Prince Wuyuan of Henan, a prince of the Western Qin state
