= Tuntuhe =

Chanyu of the Southern Xiongnu from c. 88 to 93 AD

- Xiulan Shizhu Houdi Chanyu
- Reign: c. 88–93 AD
- Predecessor: Yitu Yulüti
- Successor: Anguo
- Father: Sutuhu

Tuntuhe (Chinese: 屯屠何), the Xiulan Shizhu Houdi Chanyu (Chinese: 休蘭尸逐侯鞮單于), was the son of Sutuhu. He succeeded Yitu Yulüti in 88 AD and ruled until his death in 93 AD. He was succeeded by his cousin Anguo.

Seeing the turmoil in the north after the Xianbei had killed the Northern Xiongnu chanyu Youliu, Tuntuhe proposed a decisive campaign to take over the steppe to the Han dynasty. In mid 89 AD, General Dou Xian led an army of 45,000 Han, Qiang, and Xiongnu north. A detachment to the north-west defeated the Northern Chanyu at the Battle of the Altai Mountains while the main column burned the sacred site of Longcheng in the modern Orkhon Valley.

In early 90 AD, Geng Tan and Shizi attacked the Northern Chanyu again, killing 8,000 of his followers and capturing his consort Lady Yan as well as five of his children. The Northern Chanyu was driven further west to take refuge with the Wusun in 91 AD by Geng Kui, at which point he disappeared from record.

In early 92 AD, Dou Xian set up Yuchujian as chanyu of the north, which offended Tuntuhe. However Yuchujian died in the autumn of 93 AD under obscure circumstances, making Tuntuhe the sole chanyu of all the Xiongnu. He died shortly after and was succeeded by his cousin Anguo.

== Footnotes ==
Preceded by Yitu Yulüdi	Chanyu of the Southern Xiongnu; 88–93 AD	Succeeded by Anguo
