= Fuluohan =

Xianbei tribal chief (died 218)

- Traditional Chinese: 扶羅韓
- Simplified Chinese: 扶罗韩
Transcriptions
Standard Mandarin
- Hanyu Pinyin: Fúluóhán
- Wade–Giles: Fulohan

Fuluohan (died 218) was a Xianbei chieftain who lived during the late Eastern Han dynasty period of China. He was a member of his grandfather Tanshihuai's tribe and later led his own branch after his elder brother, Budugen became chieftain. He was killed by a rival chieftain, Kebineng.

== Life ==
Fuluohan was a grandson of the great chief, Tanshihuai and the younger brother of Kuitou. After the death of Kuitou, his elder brother, Budugen succeeded him to the chieftaincy, but their tribe continued to decline. Fuluohan, with tens of thousands of followers under his wing, eventually grew powerful enough to command his own force.

In 207, the Han dynasty warlord, Cao Cao defeated the Wuhuan at the Battle of White Wolf Mountain. Soon after, Fuluohan, Budugen and other Xianbei chiefs sent tribute and gifts to him through his general, Yan Rou. In 218, Nengchendi (能臣抵) and the other Wuhuan chieftains of Dai Commandery rebelled, and they contacted Fuluohan offering to join him. In response, Fulohan led 10,000 cavalry to meet them.

However, when they converged at the Sanggan River, the Wuhuan began to doubt their chances of success, as they found Fuluohan to be too lenient towards his subordinates. They thus invited another Xianbei chieftain, Kebineng to join their alliance, to which he agreed and brought with him another 10,000 cavalrymen. The leaders planned to swear an oath among themselves, but on the day of the meeting, Kebineng betrayed Fuluohan and killed him. Fuluohan's son, Xieguini brought his followers to surrender to Kebineng, while Budugen, angered by his brother's death, began to wage war against Kebineng.

== See also ==
- Lists of people of the Three Kingdoms
