= Wujihoushizhudi =

Chanyu of the Southern Xiongnu from c.124 to 128

Ba
- Wujihoushizhudi Chanyu
- Reign: c.124–128 AD
- Predecessor: Wanshishizhudi
- Successor: Xiuli
- Father: Huxie Shizhu Houti

Wujihoushizhudi (Chinese: 烏稽侯尸逐鞮), born Ba, was the son of Huxie Shizhu Houdi. He succeeded his brother Wanshishizhudi in 124 AD and ruled until 128 AD. He was succeeded by his brother Xiuli.

At the time of Wuji's accession, the northern borders were troubled by Xianbei raids and one of his senior officers was killed in the fighting. Wuji received assistance from the Han dynasty in fending off the Xianbei, with his reign being marked by growing dependence on the Han. Southern Xiongnu once guarded the Chinese frontier, but now they were the ones who required aid.

Wuji died in 128 AD and was succeeded by his brother Xiuli.

== Footnotes ==
Preceded by Wanshishizhudi	Chanyu of the Southern Xiongnu; 124–128 AD	Succeeded by Xiuli
