= Xiuli =

Chanyu of the Southern Xiongnu from 128 to 142

- Qute Ruoshi Zhujiu Chanyu
- Reign: c. 128–142 AD
- Predecessor: Wujihoushizhudi
- Successor: Cheniu
- Died: 142 AD
- Father: Huxie Shizhu Houdi

Xiuli (休利), the Qute Ruoshi Zhujiu Chanyu (去特若尸逐就單于), was the son of Huxie Shizhu Houdi. He succeeded his brother Wujihoushizhudi in 128 AD and ruled until 142 AD.

In 140 AD, the Xiongnu chieftains Wusi, Cheniu, and Yiti rebelled. They raided across the north of the Ordos region and attacked Xiuli's capital at Meiji in Xihe Commandery. The Han general Ma Xu forced them back but they continued to plunder the countryside. The Han court was angry with the predicament and reprimanded Xiuliu for it. Xiuli committed suicide in 142 AD and Cheniu claimed the title of chanyu in late 142 AD.

== Footnotes ==
Preceded by Wujihoushizhudi	Chanyu of the Southern Xiongnu; 128–142 AD	Succeeded by Cheniu
