= Cao Gun =

Prince of the state of Cao Wei (died 235)

Cao Gun 曹衮

Prince of Zhongshan (中山王)
- Tenure: 232 – 1 November 235
- Successor: Cao Fu

Prince of Puyang (濮陽王)
- Tenure: 226–232

Prince of Zan (贊王)
- Reign: 223–226

Prince of Beihai (北海王)
- Tenure: 222–223
- Born: Unknown
- Died: 1 November 235
- Issue: Cao Fu
Posthumous name
- Prince Gong (恭王)
- House: House of Cao
- Father: Cao Cao
- Mother: Consort Du

Cao Gun (died 1 November 235) was an imperial prince of the state of Cao Wei in the Three Kingdoms period of China.

== Early life under the Han dynasty ==
Cao Gun was a son of Cao Cao, a warlord who rose to prominence towards the end of the Han dynasty and laid the foundation for the Cao Wei state. His mother was Lady Du (杜夫人), a concubine of Cao Cao; Lady Du was also the mother of Cao Lin, Princess Gaocheng and Qin Lang. (Note: It is possible that Lady Du has another daughter, Princess Jinxiang. The Wei Mo Zhuan (魏末傳) claimed that Princess Jinxiang was He Yan's half-sister and that she was born to the same mother as the Prince of Pei (Cao Lin). Pei Songzhi pointed out that the Sanguozhi stated that Cao Lin's mother was Lady Du, while He Yan's mother was Lady Yin. Therefore, if Princess Jinxiang shared the same mother as Cao Lin, she could not have been He Yan's half-sister. Also, it is unknown if Princess Jinxiang was the same person as the Princess Gaocheng recorded in Weilüe.)

Cao Gun was enfeoffed as the "Marquis of Ping District" (平鄉侯) in 216 by Emperor Xian, the figurehead emperor of the Han dynasty. As a youth, he was known for being studious and diligent. He could already write essays when he was about nine years old. Every time when he was reading and writing, his attendants were worried that he would stress himself out and fall sick, so they advised him to rest more. However, Cao Gun continued to read and write tirelessly because he enjoyed doing so. In 217, Emperor Xian changed Cao Gun's title first to "Marquis of Dong District" (東鄉侯) and later to "Marquis of Zan" (贊侯).

== Life during Cao Pi's reign ==
In 220, following Cao Cao's death, Cao Gun's half-brother Cao Pi usurped the throne from Emperor Xian, ended the Han dynasty, and established the Cao Wei state with himself as the new emperor. He enfeoffed Cao Gun as a duke in the following year. When some officials congratulated him on becoming a duke, Cao Gun said, "I've lived in the palace my whole life so I don't understand the hardships faced by the common people and mistakes caused by arrogance and oversight. I hope that you, gentlemen, can also point out my weaknesses apart from simply congratulating me."

While his brothers indulged in fun and entertainment, Cao Gun was often seen reading and being in deep thought. The officials around Cao Gun discussed among themselves and said, "His Majesty (Cao Pi) has ordered us to observe the Duke's behaviour. It's our duty to report to His Majesty when we see the Duke behaving inappropriately. However, when we see the Duke doing good deeds, we should also praise him in front of His Majesty." They then wrote a memo to Cao Pi to praise Cao Gun. Cao Gun was shocked when he heard about it and he scolded the officials, "It is one's responsibility to conduct himself with virtue and faithfully perform his duties. There's no need to tell anyone. Now that you've informed His Majesty, I feel more pressured and burdened. Besides, if one behaves well and does good deeds, why does he need to worry that no one will know? What you've done is not helpful to me." Such was Cao Gun's humility.

In 222, Cao Pi elevated Cao Gun from the status of a duke to a prince under the title "Prince of Beihai" (北海王). In the same year, when a yellow dragon was allegedly sighted in the Zhang River (漳水) to the west of Ye (around present-day Handan, Hebei), Cao Gun thought that it was an auspicious sign so he wrote a memorial to Cao Pi to praise the emperor. Cao Pi was so pleased that he rewarded Cao Gun with 10 jin of gold and issued an imperial decree to thank Cao Gun and praise him in return.

In 223, Cao Pi changed Cao Gun's title to "Prince of Zan" (贊王). He changed it again in 226 to "Prince of Puyang" (濮陽王).

== Life during Cao Rui's reign ==
Cao Gun settled in his princedom in Puyang County in 228 during the reign of Cao Rui, Cao Pi's son and successor. He was known for being frugal and thrifty. Instead of purchasing cloth from the market, he instructed his wife and concubines to weave at home. That became a daily activity in his household.

In the winter of 231, Cao Rui summoned Cao Gun to the imperial capital Luoyang to pay his respects. In the following year, he changed Cao Gun's title to "Prince of Zhongshan" (中山王).

In 233, someone reported to the imperial court that Cao Gun had violated a curfew by walking on the streets at night when he visited Luoyang in the winter of 231. Cao Rui knew that Cao Gun had a reputation for his virtuous and good behaviour, so he wanted to overlook this transgression and issue only an official warning to Cao Gun. However, after some officials pressured him, Cao Rui decided to punish Cao Gun by removing two counties, with a total of 750 taxable households, from his princedom. Cao Gun felt so distressed and upset that he instructed his subordinates to be more mindful in the future. Cao Rui appreciated Cao Gun's expression of remorse, so he returned the two counties to Cao Gun in the following year.

In the autumn of 235, when Cao Gun fell sick, Cao Rui sent a palace physician to treat him, ordered his palace attendants to bring him various health products, and even instructed Cao Gun's mother Lady Du and brother Cao Lin to visit him. As Cao Gun's condition worsened, he maintained the same humility he showed throughout his life by saying that he was undeserving of such generosity from the emperor. Although he knew that his funeral had to be in accordance with Confucian traditions, he requested for a simple funeral and to be buried near the tomb of Quyuan (蘧瑗), a famous official from the Wey state in the Spring and Autumn period. Before his death, he told Cao Fu (曹孚), his son and heir apparent, to conduct himself with humility and virtue, to empathise with his subordinates and the common people, to respect his grandmother Lady Du and uncle Cao Lin, and to learn how to be a loyal and faithful subject of the emperor.

Cao Gun died on 1 November 235 (Note: The Sanguozhi mentioned that Cao Gun died on the jiyou day of the 10th month in the 3rd year of the Qinglong era (233–237) in Cao Rui's reign. This date corresponds to 1 November 235 in the Gregorian calendar.) and was honoured with the posthumous title "Prince Gong" (恭王). After Cao Gun's death, Cao Rui ordered Cao Gun's brother, Cao Lin, to oversee the funeral arrangements and sent his Minister Herald (大鴻臚) to attend the funeral and read a eulogy. Throughout his life, Cao Gun produced over 20,000 pieces of writing. Although he was not as talented as his half-brother Cao Zhi in literary arts, his passion for reading and writing equalled Cao Zhi's.

Cao Gun's son, Cao Fu (曹孚), succeeded him and became the next Prince of Zhongshan. Throughout the reigns of the subsequent Wei emperors, the number of taxable households in Cao Fu's princedom increased until it reached 3,400 in the reign of Cao Huan.

== See also ==
- Cao Wei family trees#Lady Du
- Lists of people of the Three Kingdoms
