= Qiuchu Julindi =

Chanyu of the Southern Xiongnu during 63 AD

Su
- Qiuchu Julindi Chanyu
- Reign: c. 63 AD
- Predecessor: Xitong Shizhu Houdi
- Successor: Huxie Shizhu Houti
- Father: Qiufu Youti

Qiuchu Julindi (Chinese: 丘除車林鞮), born Su, was the son of Qiufu Youdi. He succeeded Xitong Shizhu Houdi in 63 AD and ruled for only a few months before dying. He was succeeded by his cousin Huxie Shizhu Houti.

== Footnotes ==
Preceded by Xitong Shizhu Houdi	Chanyu of the Southern Xiongnu; 63 AD	Succeeded by Huxie Shizhu Houti
