= Punu Chanyu =

1st century Chanyu of the Xiongnu Empire

Punu
- Chanyu
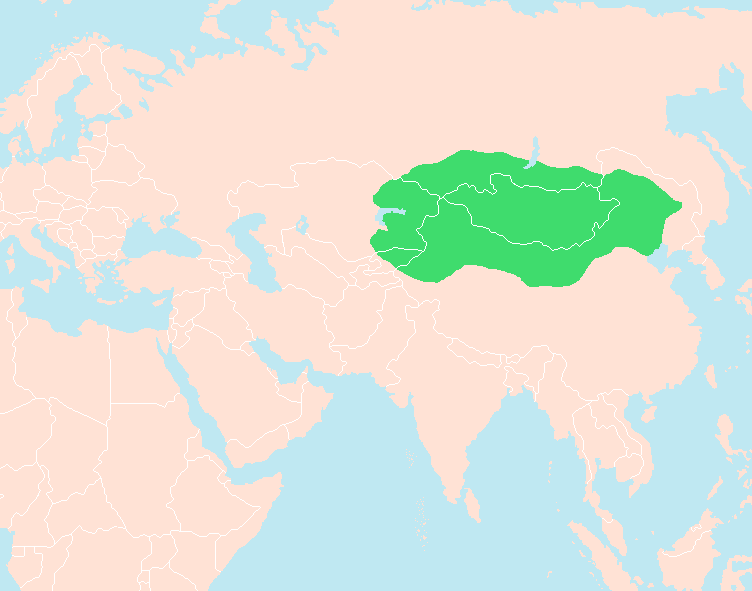
- Domain and influence of the Xiongnu
- Reign: c. 46 AD–?
- Predecessor: Wudadihou
- Successor: Youliu
- Dynasty: Modu Chanyu
- Father: Huduershidaogao Chanyu

Punu (Chinese: 蒲奴; fl. 46 AD – 75 AD) was a chanyu of the Xiongnu Empire.

Punu came to power in 46 AD when his brother Wudadihou died. At the time, the Xiongnu were experiencing a severe drought in their territory as well as raids from the Wuhuan. Punu's uncle Sutuhu offered to act as an agent to ask for aid from the Han dynasty. When Punu's officers heard of this they recommended that Sutuhu be arrested and executed. Sutuhu received warning of their advice to Punu and in retaliation gathered some 50,000 men to attack the officers. Afterwards, Sutuhu moved south to the Ordos region. In the winter of 48/49 AD, Sutuhu gained an alliance with the Han, and proclaimed himself Bi Chanyu.

In 49 AD, Bi sent his brother Mo to attack Punu. They captured Punu's younger brother Aojian and returned with 10,000 captives as well as thousands of livestock. Two of Punu's chiefs also defected to join Bi. Punu was forced to relocate north across the Gobi Desert.

Punu's brother escaped from Bi but decided to set himself up as another chanyu. He was defeated by Punu within a few months.

In 51 AD, Punu sent envoys to negotiate with the Han in Wuwei Commandery, but they were turned back. Punu sent envoys again in 52 and 55 AD to no avail. At the same time Punu subjugated the oasis states of the Western Regions and forced them to send tribute to the Xiongnu court.

In 62 AD, the Northern Xiongnu made a major raid but was repelled.

In 73 AD, Dou Gu led a force of 12,000 against the Xiongnu and defeated Huyan in modern northeastern Xinjiang.

In 75 AD, the Xiongnu besieged Jushi and Chen Mu was killed by the locals.

Punu died at an unspecified time and the next mentioned chanyu of the Northern Xiongnu was Youliu, one of his descendants.

== Footnotes ==
| Preceded by Wudadihou | Chanyu of the Xiongnu Empire; 46-? AD | Succeeded by Youliu |
