= Yitu Yulüdi =

Chanyu of the Southern Xiongnu from c.85 to 88 AD

Xuan
- Yitu Yulüdi Chanyu
- Reign: c. 85–88 AD
- Predecessor: Huxie Shizhu Houdi
- Successor: Tuntuhe
- Father: Yifa Yulüdi

Yitu Yulüdi (Chinese: 伊屠於閭鞮), born Xuan, was the son of Yifa Yulüdi. He succeeded Huxie Shizhu Houdi in 85 AD and ruled until his death in 88 AD. He was succeeded by his cousin Tuntuhe.

Upon coming to power in 85 AD, Yitu attacked the Northern Xiongnu and killed one of their kings. The Southern Xiongnu continued raiding Northern Xiongnu trade caravans.

Emperor Zhang of Han ordered the Southern Xiongnu to ransom northern prisoners to appease the Northern Xiongnu. This only strengthened the southern position as it rewarded them for their aggression.

In 88 AD, Yitu died and was succeeded by his cousin Tuntuhe.

== Footnotes ==
Preceded by Huxie Shizhu Houdi	Chanyu of the Southern Xiongnu; 85–88 AD	Succeeded by Tuntuhe
