= Yan Rou =

Early 3rd century Cao Wei official and general

- 閻柔

General Who Crosses into Liao (度遼將軍)
- In office c. 220–?
- Monarch: Cao Pi

Colonel Who Protects the Wuhuan (護烏丸校尉)
- In office 200 – 220
- Monarch: Emperor Xian of Han

Personal details
- Born: Unknown Beijing
- Died: Unknown
- Relations: Yan Zhi (brother)
- Occupation: General
- Peerage: Secondary Marquis (關內侯)

Yan Rou (fl. 193–220) was a military general of the state of Cao Wei during the Three Kingdoms period of China. He previously served under the warlord Cao Cao in the late Eastern Han dynasty.

== Life ==
Yan Rou was from Guangyang Commandery (廣陽郡), which is around present-day Beijing. In his childhood, he was abducted by the Wuhuan and Xianbei tribes in northern China, so he grew up among them and gained their trust over time. In 193, the warlord Gongsun Zan murdered Liu Yu, another warlord who had much prestige in northern China and among the Wuhuan and Xianbei. Liu Yu's son, Liu He (劉和), gathered his father's former subordinates such as Xianyu Fu (鮮于輔), Qi Zhou (齊周), Tian Chou and Xianyu Yin (鮮于銀), and enlisted Yan Rou's help in taking revenge against Gongsun Zan. They fought a battle with Gongsun Zan's forces led by Zou Dan (鄒丹) near the Chaobai River and defeated and killed Zou Dan along with 4,000 enemy soldiers. In 199, the warlord Yuan Shao also sought Yan Rou's help in building friendly ties with the Wuhuan tribes in northern China.

In 200, during the Battle of Guandu, the warlord Cao Cao, who controlled the Han central government and the figurehead Emperor Xian, contacted Yan Rou and appointed him as Colonel Who Protects the Wuhuan (護烏丸校尉). After Cao Cao defeated Yuan Tan at the Battle of Nanpi in 205, Yan Rou led the Wuhuan and Xianbei leaders in the region to pledge allegiance to Cao Cao. In recognition of Yan Rou's contributions, the Han imperial court awarded him the title of a Secondary Marquis (關內侯). Cao Cao also highly favoured Yan Rou and treated him like a son.

In 206, Yan Rou accompanied Cao Cao on a campaign against the Wuhuan tribes in You Province and served as his guide. Cao Cao defeated the Wuhuan tribes and the warlords Yuan Shang and Yuan Xi at the Battle of White Wolf Mountain in the following year. After the victory, Yan Rou managed to convince all the Wuhuan leaders in You and Bing provinces to submit to Han rule. The Xianbei chieftains Budugen and Kebineng also sent their sons as hostages to Yan Rou to convince him of their allegiance. When Tian Yin (田銀) started a rebellion in Hejian Commandery (河間郡), Kebineng led 3,000 horsemen to assist Yan Rou in suppressing the revolt.

In 220, after Cao Cao's son Cao Pi usurped the throne from Emperor Xian and established the state of Cao Wei, he appointed Yan Rou as General Who Crosses into Liao (度遼將軍).

== Family ==
Yan Rou had a younger brother, Yan Zhi (閻志), who served as the Administrator of Shanggu Commandery (上谷郡; around present-day Yanqing District, Beijing). When the Xianbei chieftain Suli (素利) was under attack by other Xianbei tribes, Yan Zhi led military forces to help him.

== See also ==
- Lists of people of the Three Kingdoms
