= Cao Lin (Prince of Pei) =

Prince of the state of Cao Wei (died 256)

Cao Lin 曹林

Prince of Pei (沛王)
- Tenure: 232 – 11 March 256
- Successor: Cao Wei

Prince of Juancheng (鄄城王)
- Tenure: 226–232

Prince of Qiao (譙王)
- Tenure: 222–226

Duke of Qiao (譙公)
- Tenure: 221–222

Marquis of Qiao (譙侯)
- Tenure: 217–221

Marquis of Raoyang (饒陽侯)
- Tenure: 211–217
- Born: Unknown
- Died: 11 March 256 (Note: Cao Mao's biography in the Sanguozhi recorded that Cao Lin died on the yisi day of the 1st month of the 1st year of the Ganlu era of Cao Mao's reign. This date corresponds to 11 March 256 in the Gregorian calendar.)
- Issue: Cao Wei; Ji Kang's wife (disputed)
Names
- Family name: Cao (曹); Given name: Lin (林)
Posthumous name
- Prince Mu (穆王)
- House: House of Cao
- Father: Cao Cao
- Mother: Consort Du

Cao Lin (died 11 March 256), posthumously known as Prince Mu of Pei, was a prince of the state of Cao Wei in the Three Kingdoms period of China. He was a son of Cao Cao, a warlord who rose to prominence towards the end of the Han dynasty and laid the foundation for the Cao Wei state. His mother was Lady Du (杜夫人), a concubine of Cao Cao; Lady Du was also the mother of Cao Gun, Princess Gaocheng and Qin Lang. In Weilüe, his name was recorded as "Cao Bao" (曹豹). (Note: It is possible that Lady Du has another daughter, Princess Jinxiang. The Wei Mo Zhuan (魏末傳) claimed that Princess Jinxiang was He Yan's half-sister and that she was born to the same mother as the Prince of Pei. Pei Songzhi pointed out that the Sanguozhi stated that Cao Lin's mother was Lady Du, while He Yan's mother was Lady Yin. Therefore, if Princess Jinxiang shared the same mother as Cao Lin, she could not have been He Yan's half-sister. Also, it is unknown if Princess Jinxiang was the same person as the Princess Gaocheng recorded in Weilüe.)

== Life ==
In 211, Emperor Xian, the last emperor of the Han dynasty, enfeoffed Cao Lin as the Marquis of Raoyang (饒陽侯). In 217, Cao Lin's title was changed to "Marquis of Qiao" (譙侯). In 221, a year after Cao Lin's half-brother Cao Pi usurped the throne from Emperor Xian and became the first emperor of the Cao Wei state, he enfeoffed Cao Lin as the Duke of Qiao (譙公). One year later, Cao Pi elevated Cao Lin from a duke to a prince under the title "Prince of Qiao" (譙王). In 226, he changed Cao Lin's title to "Prince of Juancheng" (鄄城王). In 232, Cao Pi's successor, Cao Rui, changed Cao Lin's title to "Prince of Pei" (沛王). Throughout the reigns of the subsequent Wei emperors, the number of taxable households in Cao Lin's dukedom increased until it reached 4,700. After Cao Lin died in 256, his son Cao Wei (曹緯) inherited his princedom as the new Prince of Pei. Cao Lin had a granddaughter, who married Ji Kang. (Note: However, the Jin Shu by Wang Yin recorded that Ji Kang's wife was Cao Lin's daughter.)

== See also ==
- Cao Wei family trees#Lady Du
- Lists of people of the Three Kingdoms
