= Wanshishizhudi =

Chanyu of the Southern Xiongnu from c. 98 to 124 AD

Tan
- Wanshishizhudi Chanyu
- Reign: c. 98–124 AD
- Predecessor: Shizi
- Successor: Wujihoushizhudi
- Father: Huxie Shizhu Houti

Wanshishizhudi (Chinese: 萬氏尸逐鞮), born Tan (Chinese: 檀), was the son of Huxie Shizhu Houdi. He succeeded Shizi in 98 AD and ruled until 124 AD. He was succeeded by his brother Wujihoushizhudi.

In 107 AD, the Great Qiang Rebellion in conjunction with invasions by the Wuhuan and Xianbei severely weakened the Han dynasty. In 109 AD, the Han renegade Han Zong convinced Wanshishizhudi to rebel. Wanshishizhudi attacked the emissary Geng Chong but failed to oust him. Han forces under Geng Kui retaliated and defeated a force of 3,000 Xiongnu but could not take the Southern Xiongnu capital due to disease among the horses of their Xianbei allies. In the following year, the Southern Xiongnu raided Changshan Commandery and Zhongshan Commandery. Wanshishizhudi engaged in battle with a Han army of 8,000 under Liang Qin. The Xiongnu surrounded the Han army, but Liang Qin broke through the encirclement, killing 3,000 and defeating the Xiongnu forces. Wanshishizhudi surrendered and was given amnesty. Southern Xiongnu troops fought as auxiliaries for the Han army in their conflicts with the Qiang and Xianbei in the following decade.

By the time of Wanshishizhudi's death in 124 AD, the Southern Xiongnu state was in decline. He was succeeded by his brother Wujihoushizhudi.

== Footnotes ==
Preceded by Shizi	Chanyu of the Southern Xiongnu; 98–124 AD	Succeeded by Wujihoushizhudi
