= New Book of Tang =

11th-century Chinese history book

- Traditional Chinese: 新唐書
- Simplified Chinese: 新唐书
Transcriptions
Standard Mandarin
- Hanyu Pinyin: Xīn Tángshū
- Wade–Giles: Hsin T'angshu
Southern Min
- Hokkien POJ: Sin Tông-su

Alternative Chinese name
- Traditional Chinese: 唐書
- Simplified Chinese: 唐书
Transcriptions
Standard Mandarin
- Hanyu Pinyin: Tángshū
- Wade–Giles: T'ang-shu

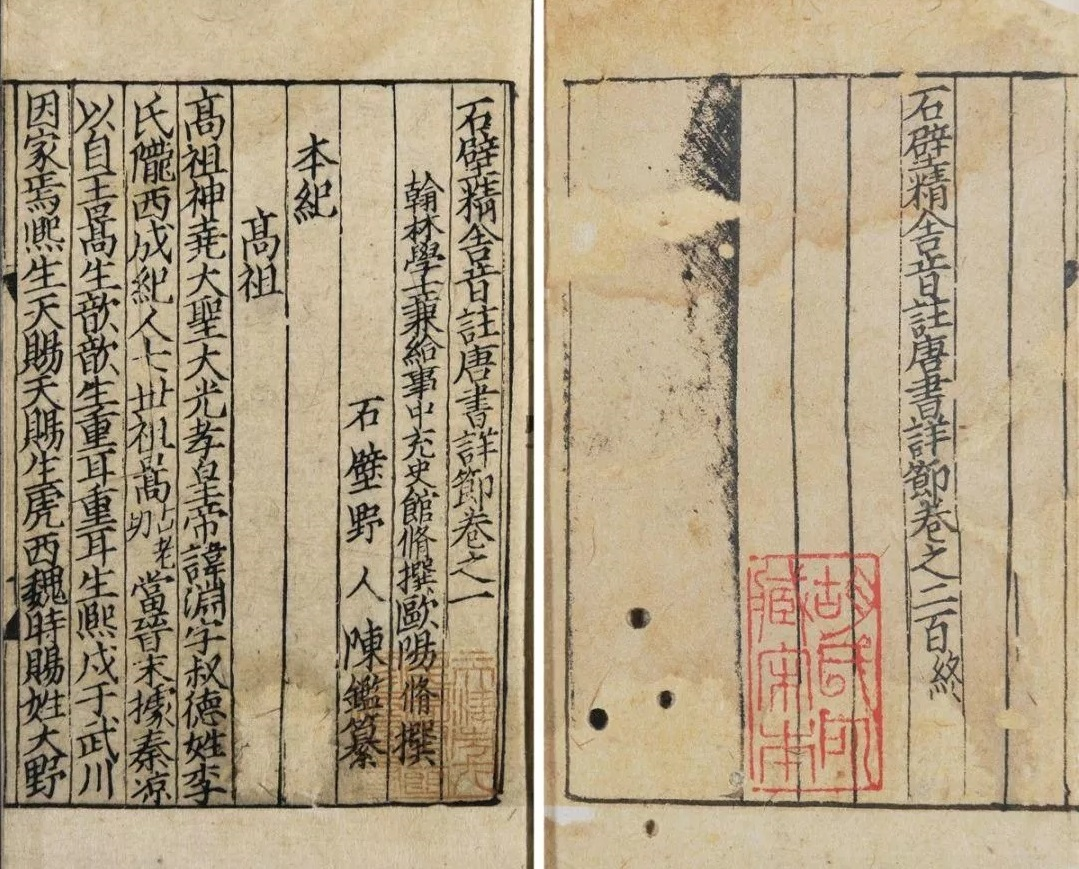
Southern Song edition of the Book of Tang edited and annotated by Chen Jian 陳鑒

The New Book of Tang, generally translated as the "New History of the Tang" or "New Tang History", is a work of official history covering the Tang dynasty in ten volumes and 225 chapters. The work was compiled by a team of scholars of the Song dynasty, led by Ouyang Xiu and Song Qi.

It was originally simply called the Tangshu (唐書, Book of Tang) until the 18th century.

== History ==
In Chinese history, it was customary for dynasties to compile histories of their immediate predecessor as a means of cementing their own legitimacy. As a result, during the Later Jin dynasty of the Five Dynasties and Ten Kingdoms period, a history of the preceding Tang dynasty, the Old Book of Tang (唐書) had already been compiled.

In 1044, however, Emperor Renzong of Song ordered a new compilation of Tang history, based on his belief that the original Old Book of Tang lacked organization and clarity. The process took 17 years, being finally completed in 1060.

== Contents ==
The New Book of Tang differed dramatically from the older version in its organization and contents, in part due to the literary and philosophical inclinations of its chief compilers. Ouyang Xiu frequently invoked the principle of reason in evaluating historical accounts, and purged all accounts containing elements of myth or superstition, thereby dramatically shortening many of the biographies of emperors and major figures.

In contrast, the New Book of Tang included several new sections of more practical interest to Tang history. These included a much expanded series of Treatises (志), including topics on the horse trade with Tibet and military affairs, and a table of the bureaucratic hierarchy of the Tang administration which was missing from the Old Book of Tang. Another feature which was revived was the use of "tables" (表), annalistic tables of events and successions which included not just the emperors themselves but also chancellors and jiedushi.

The style of prose in the New Book also differed, because Ouyang Xiu and Song Qi were both admirers of the simplified, 'ancient' prose style of Tang scholars such as Han Yu, rather than the flowery prose style found in official Tang documents. This led them to change the original wordings in the documents that they quoted in the book. However, in the reduction, the direct use of Tang court records was lost, some reduced passages were unclear, and many errors were introduced in attempting to find more 'ancient' words to rephrase the Tang originals.

=== Annals ===
The annals of the Tang emperors are covered in volumes 1–10. Wilkinson notes that the annals in the New Book of Tang are considerably shorter than the Old Book of Tang.

=== Treatises ===
The treatises are contained in volumes 11 through 60. As noted above the treatises are greatly expanded compared with the Old Book of Tang. The section on Rites and Music (禮樂) is the largest occupying 12 volumes (11-22). The New Book of Tang was the first of the standard histories to include a treatise on selecting and appointing officials (選擧志). This included a description of the examination system, which had become an increasingly important aspect of recruiting officials in the Tang, especially after 780.

=== Tables ===
The tables are contained in volumes 61–75.

=== Biographies ===
Four biographies of women appear in this new book that were not present in the first Old Book of Tang. The women kill or maim themselves in horrible ways, and represent examples of Tang dynasty women that were intended to deter contemporary readers from extreme behavior. For example, Woman Lu gouges her own eye out to assure her ailing husband that there will be no second man after him. Biographies of 35 overly filial and fraternal men are also included in the work, though these men do not resort to the extremes of female mutilation found in the female biographies.

== See also ==
- Twenty-Four Histories
