= Cheniu =

Chanyu of the Southern Xiongnu from 142 to 143

- Chanyu
- Reign: c. 142–143 AD
- Predecessor: Xiuli
- Successor: Doulouchu

Cheniu (simplified Chinese: 车纽; traditional Chinese: 車紐; pinyin: Chēniǔ; Eastern Han Chinese: *tśʰa-ṇu^{B} ) was chieftain of the Goulong clan and chanyu of the Southern Xiongnu from 142 to 143 AD.

In 140 AD, Xiongnu chiefs, Cheniu, Wusi, and Yiti rebelled. They led 8,000 men in raids across the northern Ordos region and attacked the Southern Xiongnu capital of Meiji. Han General Ma Xu repelled them with 20,000 men.

In 142 AD, the Southern Xiongnu chanyu Xiuli committed suicide. Cheniu claimed the title of chanyu and his followers, now in the tens of thousands, attacked across the northern frontier into Han territory. However, Han forces under Zhang Dan retaliated in force and won several encounters with the Xiongnu. By 143 AD, Cheniu had surrendered and Wusi was killed. The title of chanyu went to the hostage prince, Doulouchu, held captive at the Han court.

== Footnotes ==
Preceded by Xiuli	Chanyu of the Southern Xiongnu; 142–143 AD	Succeeded by Doulouchu
