= Huzheng =

Chanyu of the Southern Xiongnu from 178 to 179

- Chanyu
- Reign: c. 178–179 AD
- Predecessor: Tute Ruoshi Zhujiu
- Successor: Qiangqu
- Father: Tute Ruoshi Zhujiu

Huzheng succeeded his father Tute Ruoshi Zhujiu as chanyu of the Xiongnu in 178 AD. He was killed by the Han emissary Zhang Xiu in 179 AD. The title of chanyu passed to the Western Tuqi Prince Qiangqu.

== Footnotes ==
Preceded by Tute Ruoshi Zhujiu	Chanyu of the Southern Xiongnu; 178–179 AD	Succeeded by Qiangqu
