= Touman =

Xiongnu ruler from 220 to 209 BCE

Touman 頭曼
- Chanyu
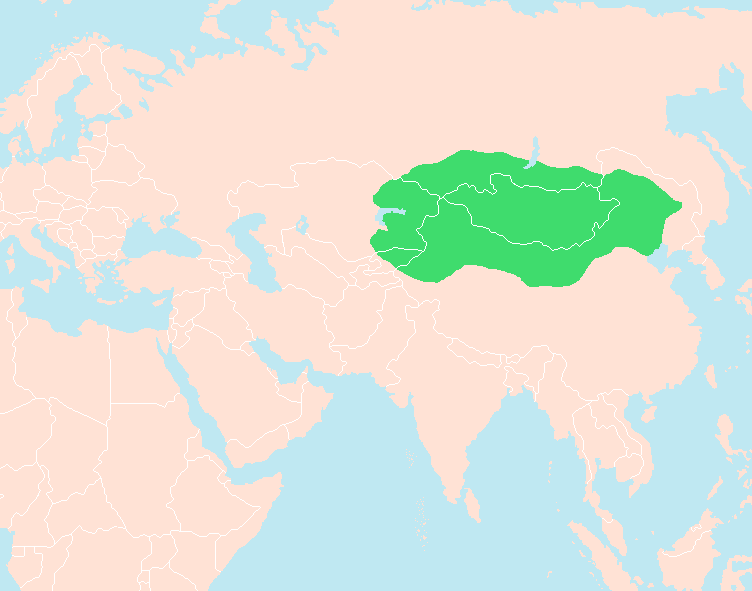
- Maximum extent of domain and influence of the Xiongnu

Chanyu of the Xiongnu
- Reign: c. 220–209 BCE
- Successor: Modu
- Died: 209 BCE

Touman (Chinese: 頭曼), from Old Chinese (220 BCE): *do-mɑnᴬ, is the earliest named chanyu (leader) of the Xiongnu tribal confederation, reigning from c. 220–209 BCE, directly preceding the formation of the Xiongnu empire.

== Life ==
Competing with the Xiongnu for supremacy were the Donghu people (lit. 'the Eastern Barbarians') and the Yuezhi. In 215 BCE, Qin Shi Huang, the founding emperor of the Qin dynasty, sent a 300,000-man army headed by General Meng Tian into the Ordos region and drove the Xiongnu northward for 1,000 li, or about 416 kilometres (258 mi). "Touman, unable to hold out against the Qin forces, had withdrawn to the far north, where he held out for over ten years."

After the death of Meng Tian in 210 BCE, Touman led the Xiongnu across the Yellow River to regain their previous territory.

A legend says that Touman favoured a younger son from another concubine. To get rid of his eldest son, Modu, Touman sent him to the Yuezhi as a hostage and then made a sudden attack on them. In retaliation, the Yuezhi prepared to kill Modu, but he managed to steal a horse and escape back to the Xiongnu. Touman was impressed by his bravery and put Modu in command of a force of 10,000 horsemen. Modu was very successful in training and his men obeyed him absolutely. In 209 BCE, Modu commanded his men to shoot his father, killing him as well as his stepmother, younger brother, and high officials who refused to take orders from him. Thereafter, Modu became chanyu.

== Footnotes ==
Preceded by Not Known	Chanyu of the Xiongnu; 220–209 BCE	Succeeded by Modu Chanyu
