= Anguo Chanyu =

Chanyu of the Southern Xiongnu from 93 to 94 AD

Anguo
- Anguo Chanyu
- Reign: c. 93–94 AD
- Predecessor: Tuntuhe
- Successor: Shizi
- Father: Yifa Yulüti

Anguo (Chinese: 安國) was the son of Yifa Yulüdi. He succeeded Tuntuhe in 93 AD and ruled until 94 AD. He was succeeded by Shizi.

In 89 AD, Anguo led Xiongnu auxiliaries against the Northern Chanyu in the Battle of the Altai Mountains.

Anguo was not a very popular chanyu and the prince Shizi overshadowed him by enthusiastically cooperating with the Han in making attacks on the Northern Xiongnu. Anguo sought to find followers among the northern refugees.

In 94 AD, Anguo wrote letters to Emperor He of Han complaining about Emissary Du Chong. Du Chong intercepted the letter and told the court he believed Anguo was planning to assassinate Shizi and other pro-Chinese chieftains. The court ordered an investigation. Du Chong and Zhu Hui led armed men into Anguo's camp. Anguo fled with a number of northern followers and went to attack Shizi, but he fled as well and took refuge at Manbo, the headquarters of the General on the Liao. Anguo was then killed by his own followers. Shizi succeeded him as chanyu, which angered the northerners, who proclaimed Fenghou as chanyu and fled north to set up their own state.

== Footnotes ==
Preceded by Tuntuhe	Chanyu of the Southern Xiongnu; 93–94 AD	Succeeded by Shizi
