= Qin Yilu =

Military officer serving Chinese warlord Lü Bu (died 199)

Qin Yilu 秦宜祿
- Born: Unknown; Togtoh County, Inner Mongolia
- Died: 199; Pei County, Jiangsu
- Occupation: Military officer
- Spouse: Lady Du
- Children: Qin Lang

Qin Yilu (died 199) was a military officer who served under the general and warlord Lü Bu in the late Eastern Han dynasty of China. Allowing for variant writing in the records, Qin Yilu was probably the same person as two others named Qin Yi (秦翊 and 秦誼).

== Life ==
Born in Yunzhong Commandery (雲中郡; west of present-day Togtoh County, Inner Mongolia), Qin Yilu served under Lü Bu, who was also from Bing Province like him. In 192, Qin Yilu was one of two men whom Lü Bu ordered to ambush and assassinate the warlord Dong Zhuo in Chang'an while in disguise as guards. He apparently followed Lü Bu when the latter fled from Chang'an and roamed around the Central Plains before seizing control of Xu Province from the warlord Liu Bei.

When Lü Bu was besieged by the allied forces of Cao Cao and Liu Bei at the Battle of Xiapi in 198, Lü Bu sent Qin Yilu to seek reinforcements from the warlords Zhang Yang and Yuan Shu. Qin Yilu's wife, Lady Du (杜氏) and their son Qin Lang remained behind in Xiapi and stayed there as the city fell to Cao Cao's forces. Liu Bei's general Guan Yu repeatedly asked Cao Cao to let him marry Lady Du after their victory over Lü Bu. Cao Cao was curious about why Guan Yu wanted Lady Du so badly, and he guessed that she must be very beautiful, so he ordered his men to bring her to meet him. As a result, despite Guan Yu's pleas, Lady Du became Cao Cao's concubine and Qin Lang became Cao Cao's adopted son.

Qin Yilu was at Yuan Shu's camp when Xiapi fell. To replace his lost wife, Yuan Shu arranged a marriage between Qin Yilu and a noble lady from the imperial clan of the Han dynasty. However, Yuan Shu began to have designs on the imperial throne. Qin Yilu, uneasy of being associated with a traitor, heeded Liu Fu's advice and surrendered to Cao Cao, who controlled the formal Han government and the Han emperor.

Under Cao Cao, Qin Yilu was given a position as the Magistrate of Zhi County (銍縣), a small county in Pei State (沛國). When Liu Bei rebelled against Cao Cao and passed by Xiaopei (小沛; present-day Pei County, Jiangsu), Liu Bei's general Zhang Fei called on Qin Yilu and scorned him, "Another man took your wife, but you chose to be a magistrate under him! How can you behave so ignorantly as though nothing has happened! You wish to follow us?" Qin Yilu followed Liu Bei and travelled for several li before he regretted and decided to leave. Zhang Fei killed him.

Qin Yilu's son, Qin Lang, was adopted by Cao Cao and later became a prominent general in the state of Cao Wei – founded by Cao Cao's son and successor, Cao Pi – during the Three Kingdoms period.

== See also ==
- Cao Wei family trees § Lady Du
- Lists of people of the Three Kingdoms
