= Doulouchu =

Chanyu of the Southern Xiongnu from 143 to 147

- Hulan Ruoshi Zhujiu Chanyu
- Reign: 24 July 143 – 147 AD
- Predecessor: Cheniu
- Successor: Jucheer

Doulouchu (simplified Chinese: 兜楼储; traditional Chinese: 兜樓儲 < Eastern Han Chinese: *to-lo-ḍiɑ) was a Xiongnu prince of unknown relationship to the Southern Xiongnu dynastic line who was proclaimed chanyu by the Han dynasty in 24 July 143 AD. Toulouchu resided in the Southern Xiongnu capital of Meiji in Xihe Commandery. It is doubtful whether he wielded any real power over his nominal subjects. He died four years later in 147 AD and was succeeded by Jucheer.

== Footnotes ==
Preceded by Cheniu	Chanyu of the Southern Xiongnu; 24 July 143 – 147 AD	Succeeded by Jucheer
