= Jucheer =

Chanyu of the Southern Xiongnu from 147 to 172

- Yiling Ruoshi Zhujiu Chanyu
- Reign: c. 147–172 AD
- Predecessor: Doulouchu
- Successor: Tute Ruoshi Zhujiu
- Died: 172 AD

Jucheer (居車兒) was a Xiongnu of unknown relationship to the royal dynastic lineage who succeeded Doulouchu as chanyu in 147 AD. In 166 AD, Jucheer joined the Xianbei and Wuhuan in raiding Han territory. When the Wuhuan and Xiongnu were confronted by Han forces they immediately surrendered. Zhang Huan wanted to have Jucheer dismissed, but Emperor Huan of Han was unwilling to remove an established ruler and deemed Jucheer to be an innocent party forced into rebellion. Jucheer died in 172 AD and was succeeded by his son Tute Ruoshi Zhujiu.

== Footnotes ==
Preceded by Doulouchu	Chanyu of the Southern Xiongnu; 147–172 AD	Succeeded by Tute Ruoshi Zhujiu
