= Xitong Shizhu Houdi =

Chanyu of the Southern Xiongnu from c. 59 to 63 AD

Shi
- Xitong Shizhu Houdi Chanyu
- Reign: c. 59–63 AD
- Predecessor: Yifa Yulüdi
- Successor: Qiuchu Julinti
- Father: Sutuhu

Xitong Shizhu Houdi (Chinese: 䤈僮尸逐侯鞮), born Shi (适), was the son of Sutuhu. He succeeded Yifa Yulüti in 59 AD and ruled until 63 AD. In 62 AD he helped the Han dynasty in repelling Northern Xiongnu from Wuyuan and Yunzhong commanderies. He was succeeded by his cousin Qiuchu Julinti.

== Footnotes ==
Preceded by Yifa Yulüdi	Chanyu of the Southern Xiongnu; 59–63 AD	Succeeded by Qiuchu Julinti
