= Song Qi =

Chinese statesman, historian and poet (998–1061)

Song Qi (Chinese: 宋祁; 998–1061), courtesy name Zijing (子京), was a Chinese essayist, historian, poet, and politician of the Northern Song dynasty.

== Imperial advisor ==
Song was a Grand Councilor in the Imperial Chinese court. In this role, he was called to become a military analyst:

"The reason why our enemies to the north and west are able to withstand China is precisely because they have many horses and their men are adept at riding; this is their strength. China has few horses, and its men are not accustomed to riding; this is China's weakness.... The court constantly tries, with our weakness, to oppose our enemies' strength, so that we lose every battle .... Those who propose remedies for this situation merely wish to increase our armed forces in order to overwhelm the enemy. They do not realize that, without horses, we can never create an effective military force."

While China had many men in Chinese cavalry, very few of them actually had horses to ride; and if they did actually have a horse, they did not ride well. In stark contrast, the military forces arising from Inner Asia had many horses and the men had excellent riding skills.

== Historian ==
As an historian and writer, Song is best known for his work as co-author of New History of the Tang Dynasty (新唐書). This work was created in collaboration with Ouyang Xiu; and it was officially presented to the emperor in 1060.

== See also ==
- Twenty-Four Histories
