= Modu Chanyu =

Chanyu of the Xiongnu Empire from 209 to 174 BCE

Modu

Chanyu of the Xiongnu Empire
- Reign: 209–174 BCE
- Predecessor: Touman
- Successor: Laoshang
- Born: c. 234 BCE modern-day Mongolia
- Died: 174 BCE (age 59–60)
- Dynasty: Luandi
- Father: Touman

Chinese name
- Traditional Chinese: 冒頓單于
- Simplified Chinese: 冒顿单于
Transcriptions
Standard Mandarin
- Hanyu Pinyin: Mòdú Chányú
Middle Chinese
- Middle Chinese: *mau^{H}-tuǝn^{H}

Sima Zhen's reading
- Chinese: 墨頓
Transcriptions
Standard Mandarin
- Hanyu Pinyin: Mòdùn
Middle Chinese
- Middle Chinese: *mək-tuən^{H}

Song Qi's reading
- Chinese: 墨毒
Transcriptions
Standard Mandarin
- Hanyu Pinyin: Mòdú
Middle Chinese
- Middle Chinese: *mək-duok

Modu (c. 234–174 BCE) was the son of Touman and the founder of the empire of the Xiongnu. He came to power by ordering his men to kill his father in 209 BCE.

Modu ruled from 209 to 174 BCE. He was a military leader under his father Touman and later chanyu of the Xiongnu Empire, based on the Mongolian Plateau. He secured the throne and established a powerful Xiongnu Empire by successfully unifying the tribes of the Mongolian–Manchurian grassland in response to the loss of Xiongnu pasture lands to invading Qin forces commanded by Meng Tian in 215 BCE.

While Modu rode and then furthered the wave of militarization and effectively centralized Xiongnu power, the Qin quickly fell into disarray with the death of the first emperor in 210 BCE, leaving Modu a free hand to expand his empire into one of the largest of his time.

The eastern border stretched as far as the Liao River, the western borders of the empire reached the Pamir Mountains, whilst the northern border reached Lake Baikal. Modu's raids into China resulted in the dynasty agreeing to pay an annual tribute alongside other goods such as silk, grain and rice. Modu was succeeded by his son Laoshang.

== Name ==
His name is reconstructed as *mǝk-tuən^{C} in Later Han Chinese and mək-twən in Middle Chinese. (Note: Another LHC pronunciation *mou^{C}-tuən^{C} yields MC mau^{H}-tuǝn^{H} and then modern Màodùn.) The name's Old Chinese pronunciation might have represented the pronunciation of the foreign word *baɣtur, a relative of the later attested Central Eurasian culture word baɣatur "hero". According to Gerard Clauson, bağatur, transcribed by Chinese with -n for foreign -r, was by origin almost certainly a "Hunnic" (Xiongnu) proper name. (Note: Gerard Clauson's personal classification implies that Huns are a descendant group of Xiongnu, which is itself controversial and has no general consensus within linguistic and historical circles.)

Ancient commentaries indicate that the characters of his name should be pronounced using special readings reserved for characters when converted to a different part-of-speech, used with an unusual meaning, or used in place names or personal names (a practice known as 破讀 (pòdú, 'broken reading')). Different commentaries give slightly different versions: his name was given as MC mək-tuən^{H} (墨頓; following Sima Zhen's commentary on Shiji) and MC mək-duok (墨毒; following Song Qi's commentary on Hanshu), the latter of which, according to Pulleyblank (1999), "does not make sense" phonologically.

== Origins and rise to power ==
According to Sima Qian (Chapter 110, "Biographies of the Xiongnu" of the Shiji), Modu was a gifted child but his father Touman wanted the son of another of his wives to succeed him. To eliminate Modu as a competitor to his chosen heir, Touman sent the young Modu to the Yuezhi as a hostage; then he attacked the Yuezhi in the hope that they would kill Modu as retribution. However, Modu escaped by stealing a fast horse and returned to the Xiongnu, who welcomed him as a hero. As reward for this show of bravery, his father appointed him the commander of 10,000 horsemen.

Due to his reputation for bravery, Modu began to gather a group of extremely loyal warriors. He invented a signaling arrow that made a whistling sound in flight and trained his men to shoot in the direction of the sound in synchrony. To be sure of his men's loyalty, Modu commanded the warriors to shoot his favourite horse; any who refused to do so were summarily executed. He later repeated this test of loyalty, but with one of his favourite wives, and once again executed those who hesitated to carry out his order. Only when he was convinced of the absolute loyalty of his remaining warriors did he order them to shoot his father during a hunting trip, killing him in a shower of arrows. With none of his followers failing to shoot at his command and with the removal of his father, Modu proclaimed himself chanyu of the Xiongnu.

After his self-proclaimed ascension as chanyu, Modu began to eliminate those who would prove a threat to his newly acquired power. Thus, he proceeded to execute his rival half-brother, his step-mother and other Xiongnu officials who refused to support his rule.

== Rise of the Xiongnu Empire ==
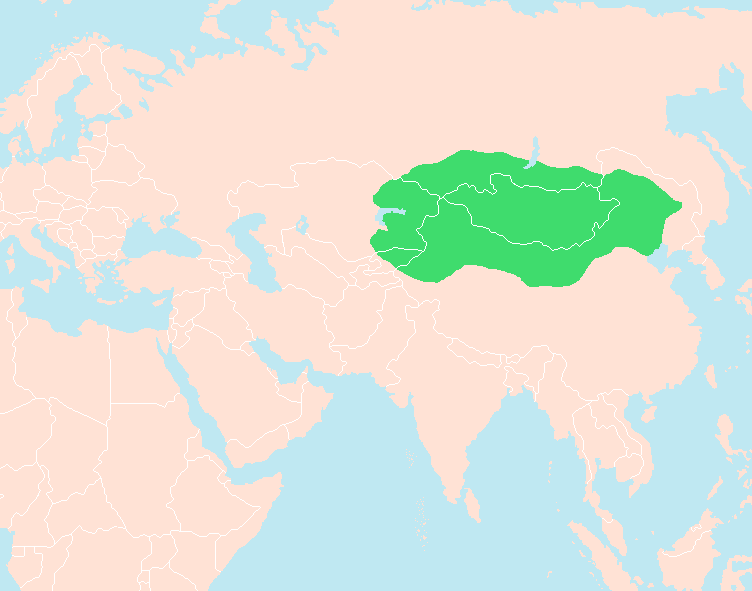
Domain and influence of the Xiongnu under Modu at the start of his rule

Modu's Xiongnu Empire aggressively protected and expanded their territory. When their eastern neighbors, the Donghu, expressed desire to occupy uninhabited land between them, Modu reacted by attacking them. By 208 BCE, the Donghu had been defeated and their remnants split into the Xianbei and Wuhuan tribes. Modun went on to subdue the Dingling and other peoples to the north, and defeat the Yuezhi in 203 BCE. After these conquests, all Xiongnu lords submitted to him.

With these victories, he was able to gain control of the important trade routes, which later supplied the Xiongnu with a large income.

=== War with the Han dynasty ===
In 200 BCE, Xin, King of Han, surrendered to the Xiongnu at Mayi, Shuofang, Dai Commandery, and joined them in raiding Han territory. Emperor Gaozu of Han led an army against them and scattered their forces, defeating them several times before they retreated. Later Xin set up Zhao Li as King of Zhao and marched south against Gaozu. They too were defeated. Seeing the influence the Xiongnu had on his vassals, Gaozu marched north with a 320,000 strong army to confront them. However his men suffered due to inadequate clothing to ward off the cold and a lack of supplies, so Gaozu left them behind and advanced to Pingcheng with only 40,000 men. Modu Chanyu saw his chance to turn the tide and immediately surrounded the city with only 40,000 cavalry, cutting the emperor off from the rest of his army. For unclear reasons, the Chanyu eventually withdrew some of his men. Sima Qian suggests his consort persuaded him to let the Emperor escape. However a prolonged siege would have been impractical anyway since Xin's infantry didn't make it on time. Seeing the Chanyu's thinned lines, Gaozu sortied out and broke the siege. When Han reinforcements arrived, the Xiongnu withdrew. This came to be known as the Battle of Baideng. Gaozu's narrow escape from capture by the Xiongnu convinced him to make peace. He sent a "princess" to the Chanyu (heqin, marriage alliance) and offered him silk, wine, and food stuffs. The Chanyu accepted the offer and restricted himself to minor raids throughout the duration of Gaozu's reign. The Han dynasty sent commoner women falsely labeled as "princesses" and members of the Han imperial family multiple times when they were practicing heqin marriage alliances with the Xiongnu in order to avoid sending the emperor's daughters.

After his Chinese campaign, Modu forced the Yuezhi and the Wusun to become vassals of the Xiongnu.

In 195 BCE, Lu Wan King of Yan, fled to the Xiongnu after he was defeated by the Han general Zhou Bo.

In 178 BCE, the Xiongnu overran the Yuezhi and Wusun in Gansu and the Tarim Basin.

Modu died in 174 BCE and was succeeded by his son, Jiyu, who became Laoshang Chanyu.

=== Marriage proposal to Empress Lü Zhi ===
In 192 BCE Empress Dowager Lü Zhi (widow of Emperor Gaozu of Han) received a marriage proposal from Modu, who wrote as follows in a letter meant to intimidate and mock her:

I'm a lonesome ruler born in marshes and raised in plains populated by livestock. I've visited your border numerous times and wanted to tour China. Your Majesty is now alone and living in solitude. Since both of us are not happy and have nothing to entertain ourselves, I'm willing to use what I possess to exchange for what you lack.

Lü Zhi was infuriated at the rude proposition, and in a heated court session, her generals advised her to rally an army and exterminate the Xiongnu immediately. As she was about to declare war, an outspoken attendant named Ji Bu pointed out that the Xiongnu army was much more powerful than the Chinese. At Ji Bu's words, the court immediately fell into a fearful silence. Rethinking her plans, Lü Zhi rejected Modu's proposition humbly, as follows:

Your Lordship does not forget our land and writes a letter to us, we fear. I retreat to preserve myself. I'm old and frail, I'm losing hair and teeth, and I struggle to maintain balance when I move. Your Lordship has heard wrongly, you shouldn't defile yourself. Our people did not offend you, and should be pardoned. We've two imperial carriages and eight fine steeds, which we graciously offer to Your Lordship.

However she continued implementing the heqin policy of marrying so called "princesses" to Xiongnu chieftains and paying tribute to the Xiongnu in exchange for peace between both sides.

== Analysis of the Xiongnu's rise ==
As Nicola Di Cosmo summarizes the sequence of events, the Qin invasion of the Ordos Plateau (the area within the bend of the Yellow River) came at the same time as a leadership crisis within the loose Xiongnu confederation. Modu took advantage of the Xiongnu militarization process that came in response to the Qin invasion, and ably created a newly centralized political structure that made his empire possible. He was aided by the rapid fall of Qin and the fact that the Han initially set up independent "kingdoms", whose leaders, like Xin, King of Han, were as likely to ally with Xiongnu and attack Han as the other way around. Han weakness meant that it supplied Modu and his successors with a steady flow of luxury and staple tribute they could pass down to the aristocracy supporting them. Without that tribute, the Xiongnu might not have been able to expand and maintain control.

== Later legends ==
Christopher I. Beckwith has pointed out that the story of the young Modu resembles a widespread class of folk tales in which a young hero is abandoned, goes on a quest, proves his worth, gains a group of trusted companions, returns to his home country, slays a powerful figure and becomes a king.

The name Modu has been associated with Oghuz Khagan, a legendary ancestor of Oghuz Turks. The reason for that is a striking similarity of the Oghuz Khagan biography in the Turco-Persian tradition (Rashid-al-Din Hamadani, Husayni Isfahani, Abu al-Ghazi Bahadur) with the Modu biography in the Chinese sources (feud between the father and son and murder of the former, the direction and sequence of conquests, etc.), which was first noticed by Hyacinth (Compilation of reports, pp. 56–57).

Another suggestion connects it with the name of the Magyar royal tribe of the Hungarians and with their distant relatives the Mators, now extinct. Modu has been linked with the name вихтунь mentioned in the Nominalia of the Bulgarian Khans, corresponding to the Old Chinese pronunciation of his name 冒頓 (*mək-tuən), and his clan Dulo with the Xiongnu ruling house 屠各 Tuge (in Old Chinese d'o-klâk). It has been suggested that his name, as Beztur, appears in the genealogy as the ancestor of Attila, in the Chronica Hungarorum of Johannes de Thurocz.

== Legacy ==
Modu Chanyu is also known as Mete Khan (particularly, Mete Han in Turkish) across a number of Turkic languages.

The Turkish Land Forces claims the beginning of his reign in 209 BCE as its symbolic founding date.

Some historians argue that Modu Chanyu (Mete Khan) was the first ruler to establish a fully developed decimal military organization, based on descriptions in early Chinese sources.

=== Sculptures ===
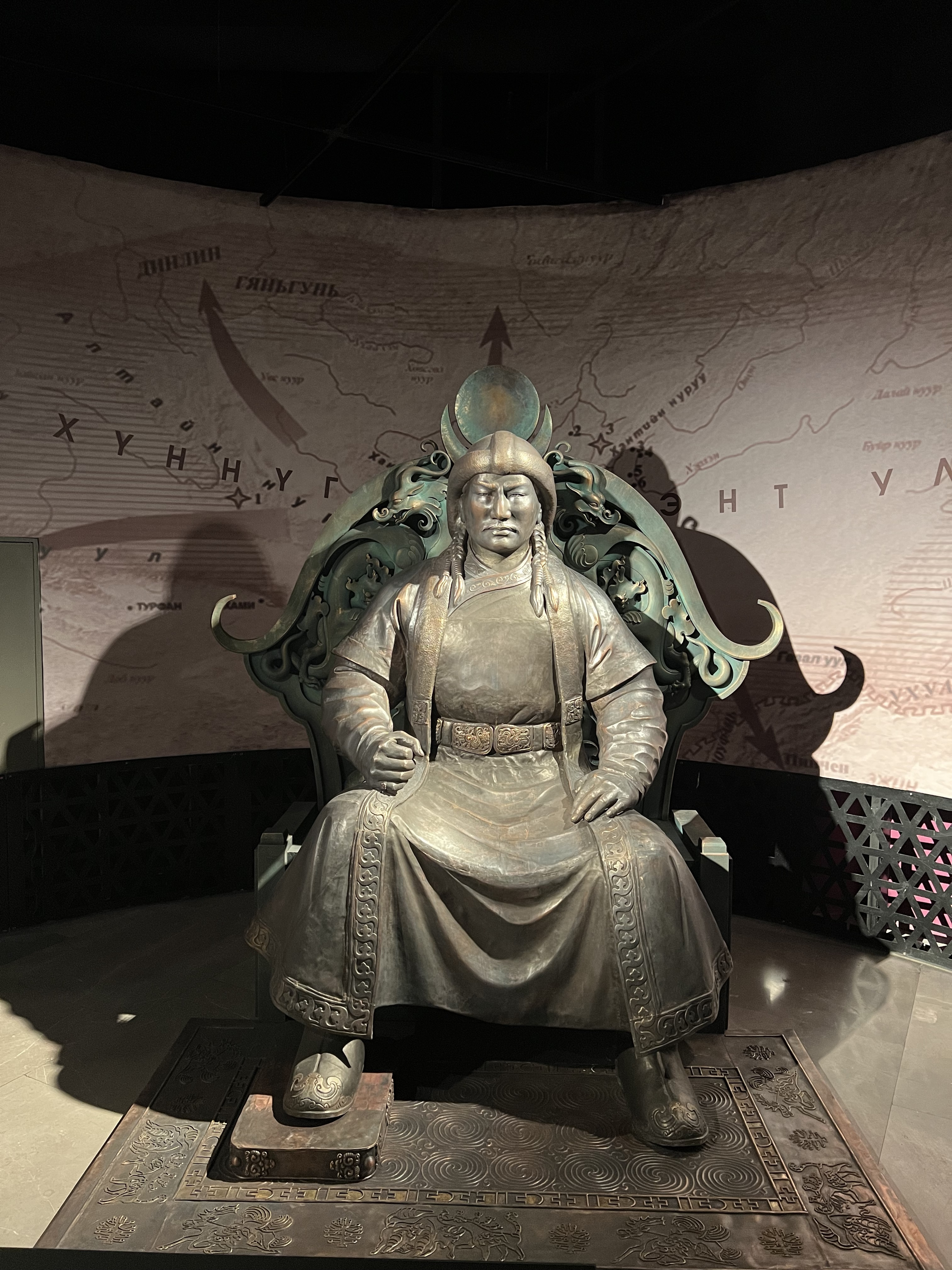
Sculpture of Modu Chanyu. Chinggis Khaan National Museum, Ulaanbaatar.

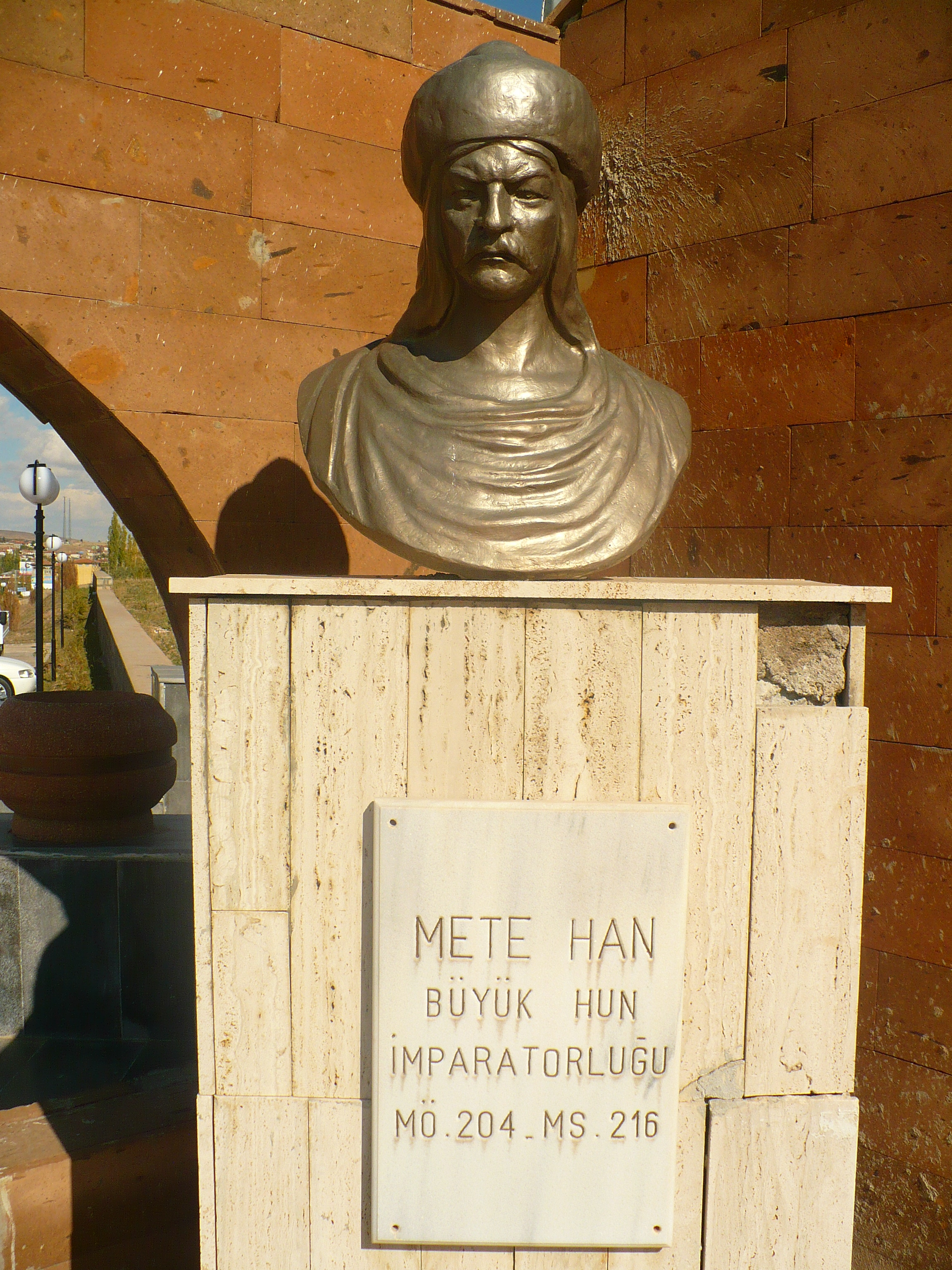
Bust of Modu (Mete Han), part of the "Monument of Turkishness" in Pınarbaşı, Kayseri, Turkey

== See also ==
- Ban Chao
- Han–Xiongnu War
- Jin Midi
- Shan Yu from 1998 Disney's film Mulan

== Notes ==
Preceded by Touman	Chanyu of the Xiongnu Empire; 209–174 BC	Succeeded by Laoshang Chanyu
