= Wudadihou =

Chanyu of the Xiongnu Empire during 46 AD

- Chanyu
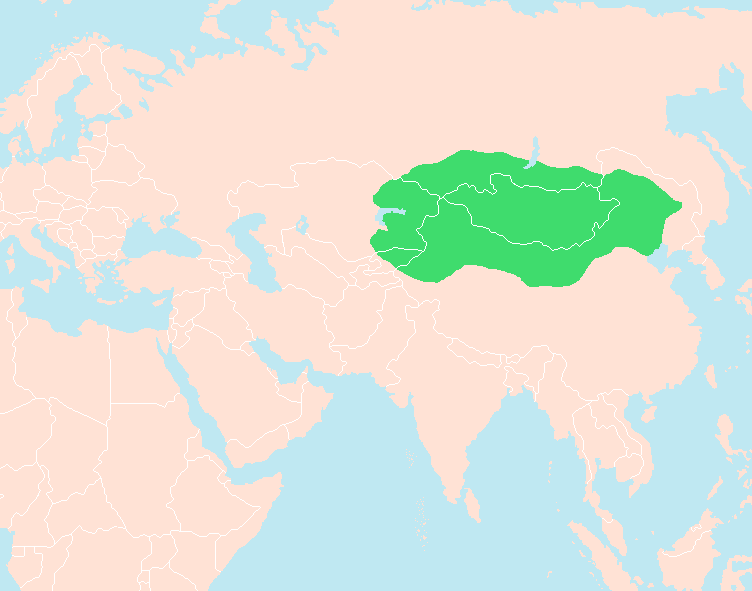
- Domain and influence of the Xiongnu
- Reign: 46 AD
- Predecessor: Huduershidaogao Chanyu
- Successor: Punu Chanyu
- Died: 46 AD
- Dynasty: Modu Chanyu
- Father: Huduershidaogao Chanyu

Wudadihou (Chinese: 烏達鞮侯; died 46 AD) was a chanyu of the Xiongnu Empire. The son and successor of Huduershidaogao, he reigned for a few months in 46 AD before dying. He was succeeded by his brother Punu.

== Footnotes ==
Preceded by Huduershidaogao	Chanyu of the Xiongnu Empire; 46 AD	Succeeded by Punu Chanyu
