= Corieltauvi =

British tribe of the Iron Age and Roman era

Geography
- Capital: Ratae Corieltauvorum (Leicester)
- Location: East Midlands of England
- Rulers: Volisios; Dumnocoveros, Dumnovellaunus, Cartivelios

The Corieltauvi (also the Coritani, and the Corieltavi) were a Celtic tribe living in Britain prior to the Roman conquest, and thereafter a civitas of Roman Britain. Their territory was in what is now the English East Midlands. They were bordered by the Brigantes to the north, the Cornovii to the west, the Dobunni and Catuvellauni to the south, and the Iceni to the east. Their capital was called Ratae Corieltauvorum, known today as Leicester.

== Late Iron Age ==
The Corieltauvi were a largely agricultural people who had few strongly defended sites or signs of centralised government. They appear to have been a federation of smaller, self-governing tribal groups. From the beginning of the 1st century, they began to produce inscribed coins: almost all featured two names, and one series had three, suggesting they had multiple rulers. The names on the earliest coins are so abbreviated as to be unidentifiable. Later coins feature the name of Volisios, apparently the paramount king of the region, together with names of three presumed sub-kings, Dumnocoveros, Dumnovellaunus and Cartivelios, in three series minted ca. 45 AD. The Corieltauvi had an important mint, and possibly a tribal centre, at Sleaford.

Pale gold stater of the Corieltauvi

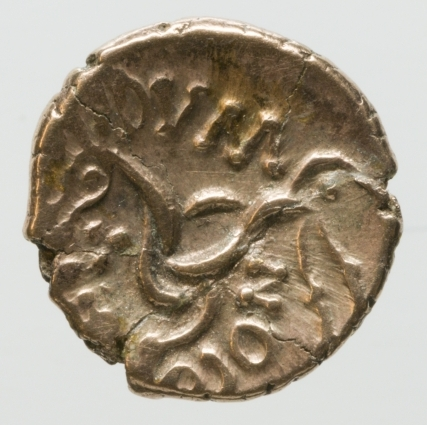
O: Horse icon and lettering

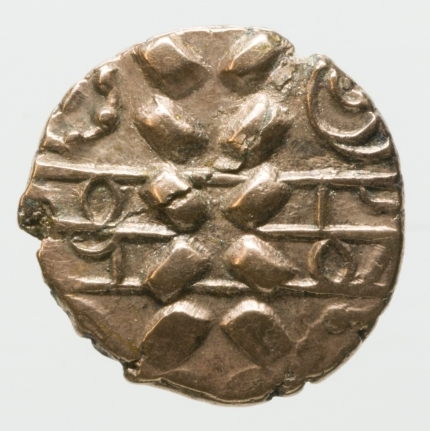
R: sheaf-of-wheat icon

A stater found near Walkington now in the Yorkshire Museum

The discovery in 2000 of the Hallaton Treasure more than doubled the total number of Corieltauvian coins previously recorded. In 2014 26 gold and silver Corieltauvian coins were found in Reynard's Kitchen Cave in Derbyshire. Coins attributed to the Corieltavi have been unearthed in Llangoed on Anglesey in Wales; fifteen gold staters were found by metal detectorists between July 2021 and March 2022.

== Roman times ==
There is little evidence that the Corieltauvi offered resistance to Roman rule: Ratae was captured c. AD 44, and it may have had a Roman garrison.

The Roman roads Fosse Way, Watling Street, and Ermine Street passed through their territory.

== Name ==
Their name appears as Coritani and Coritavi in Ptolemy's 2nd century Geography. However, the Ravenna Cosmography gives the name of their capital, in apparently corrupt form, as Rate Corion Eltavori, and an inscribed tile found in Churchover calls the administrative district Civitas Corieltauvorum, indicating that the true form should be Corieltauvi.

Manley Pope, author of an early English translation of the Welsh chronicle Brut y Brenhinedd, associated the Coritani of the Roman writers with the magical race called the Coraniaid in the medieval Welsh tale Lludd and Llevelys, however this is not supported by modern historical linguistics.

The name has been adopted by the athletics club, Leicester Coritanian A.C.

== The Barnetby bull rider ==
A detectorist found a small figure of a woman riding a bull in a field in Barnetby le Wold, Lincolnshire in 2016. The piece was handed over to the British Museum's Portable Antiquities Scheme, and experts declared it to be of regional importance. Adam Staples, from Essex Coin Auctions, said it was thought to be the only recorded example of a figure riding a bull and probably dated from the early 1st century AD. The figure was auctioned for £7,800 on 9 November 2022.
