= Tute Ruoshi Zhujiu =

Chanyu of the Southern Xiongnu from 172 to 178

- Tute Ruoshi Zhujiu Chanyu
- Reign: c. 172–178 AD
- Predecessor: Jucheer
- Successor: Huzheng
- Died: 178 AD
- Father: Jucheer

Tute Ruoshi Zhujiu (屠特若尸逐就) succeeded his father Jucheer as chanyu of the Xiongnu in 172 AD. In 177 AD, Tute and a contingent of horsemen took part in an expedition against the Xianbei. They were defeated and only a quarter of their forces returned alive. Tute died in 178 AD and was succeeded by his son Huzheng.

== Footnotes ==
Preceded by Jucheer	Chanyu of the Southern Xiongnu; 172–178 AD	Succeeded by Huzheng
