= Shizi (chanyu) =

Chanyu of the Southern Xiongnu from 94 to 98 AD

- Tingdu Shizhu Houdi Chanyu
- Reign: c. 94–98 AD
- Predecessor: Anguo
- Successor: Wanshishizhudi
- Father: Xitong Shizhu Houdi

Tingdu Shizhu Houdi (Chinese: 亭獨尸逐侯鞮), personal name Shizi (Chinese: 師子), was the son of Xitong Shizhu Houdi. He succeeded Anguo Chanyu in 94 AD and ruled until 98 AD. He was succeeded by Wanshishizhudi.

Shizi commanded Southern Xiongnu cavalry forces against the Northern Chanyu from 89 to 91 AD. He was highly popular with the Southern Xiongnu for his tenacious oppression of the northerners.

In 94 AD, Anguo Chanyu was pressured into attacking Shizi, who took refuge with the General on the Liao. When the attack failed, Anguo's followers killed him. Shizi became chanyu and took the title of Tingdu Shizhu Houti. Many of the northern refugees did not like this however and attacked Shizi and Du Chong, who took refugee in a herding office before Han forces arrived and drove the northerners away. The northern refugees proclaimed Fenghou as their chanyu and fled across the frontier.

Shizi planned on arresting the subordinate king Wujuzhan, a friend of Anguo, who he suspected of planning his assassination. Wujuzhan fled into the hill country where he launched raids into Han territory. He was killed by Han forces in 96 AD.

Shizi died in 98 AD and was succeeded by his cousin Wanshishizhudi.

== Footnotes ==
Preceded by Anguo	Chanyu of the Southern Xiongnu; 94–98 AD	Succeeded by Wanshishizhudi
