= Dumnocoveros =

Dumnocoveros was a local ruler or king based in the English East Midlands, around the time of the Roman conquest of Britain. He is traditionally thought to have been a ruler of the Corieltavi, a Celtic tribe who inhabited this region in the Roman period and perhaps before.

He is only known from coin inscriptions, which suggest that he was a co-ruler or subordinate of Volisios.
