= Cartivellaunos =

Cartivellaunos was a local ruler or king based in the English East Midlands, around the time of the Roman conquest of Britain. He is traditionally thought to have been a ruler of the Corieltauvi, who inhabited this region in the Roman period and perhaps before.

He is known only through inscriptions on coins. His name appears on coins minted c. AD 30-60, paired with the name Volisios, who is thought to have been an ally or co-ruler.
