= Volisios =

Volisios was a local ruler or king based in the English East Midlands, around the time of the Roman conquest of Britain. He is traditionally thought to have been a ruler of the Corieltavi, who inhabited this region in the Roman period and perhaps before.

He is known only through inscriptions on coins. His name appears on three series of coins, minted c. AD 30-60, paired with three other names, which are thought to be allies or subordinate rulers, Dumnovellaunus, Dumnocoveros and Cartivellaunos. A large number of his coins were found in two hoards found at Lightcliffe and Honley in Yorkshire.
