= Chanyu =

Emperor title of the Xiongnu

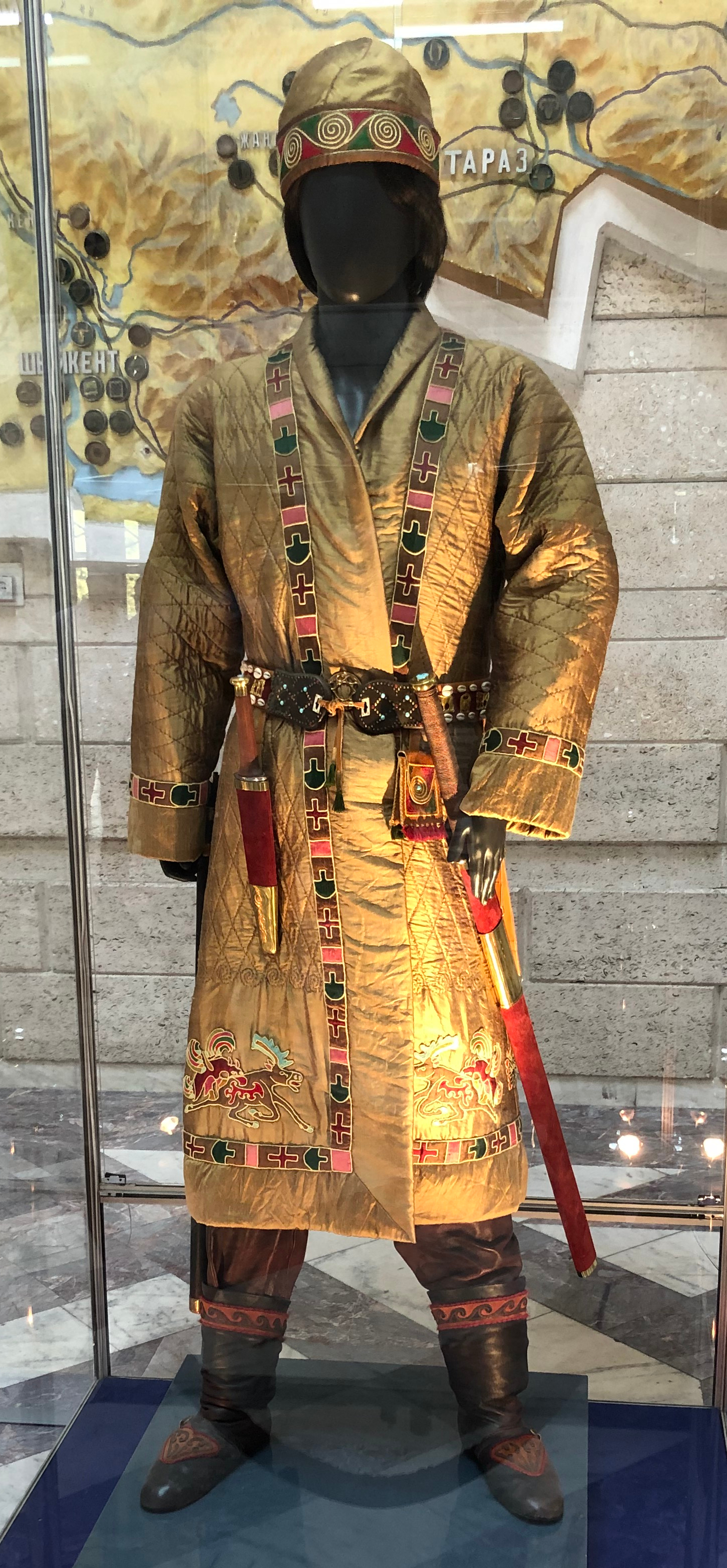
Reconstruction of a Xiongnu chief warrior, 2nd century BC – 1st century AD, by archaeologist A.N. Podushkin. Central State Museum of Kazakhstan.

Chanyu (simplified Chinese: 单于; traditional Chinese: 單于; pinyin: Chányú) or Shanyu (Chinese: 善于), short for Chengli Gutu Chanyu (Chinese: 撐犁孤塗單于; pinyin: Chēnglí Gūtu Chányú), was the title used by the supreme rulers of Inner Asian nomads for eight centuries until superseded by the title "Khagan" in 402 AD. The title was most famously used by the ruling Luandi clan of the Xiongnu during the Qin dynasty (221–206 BC) and Han dynasty (206 BC – 220 AD). It was later also used infrequently by the Chinese as a reference to Tujue leaders.

== Etymology ==
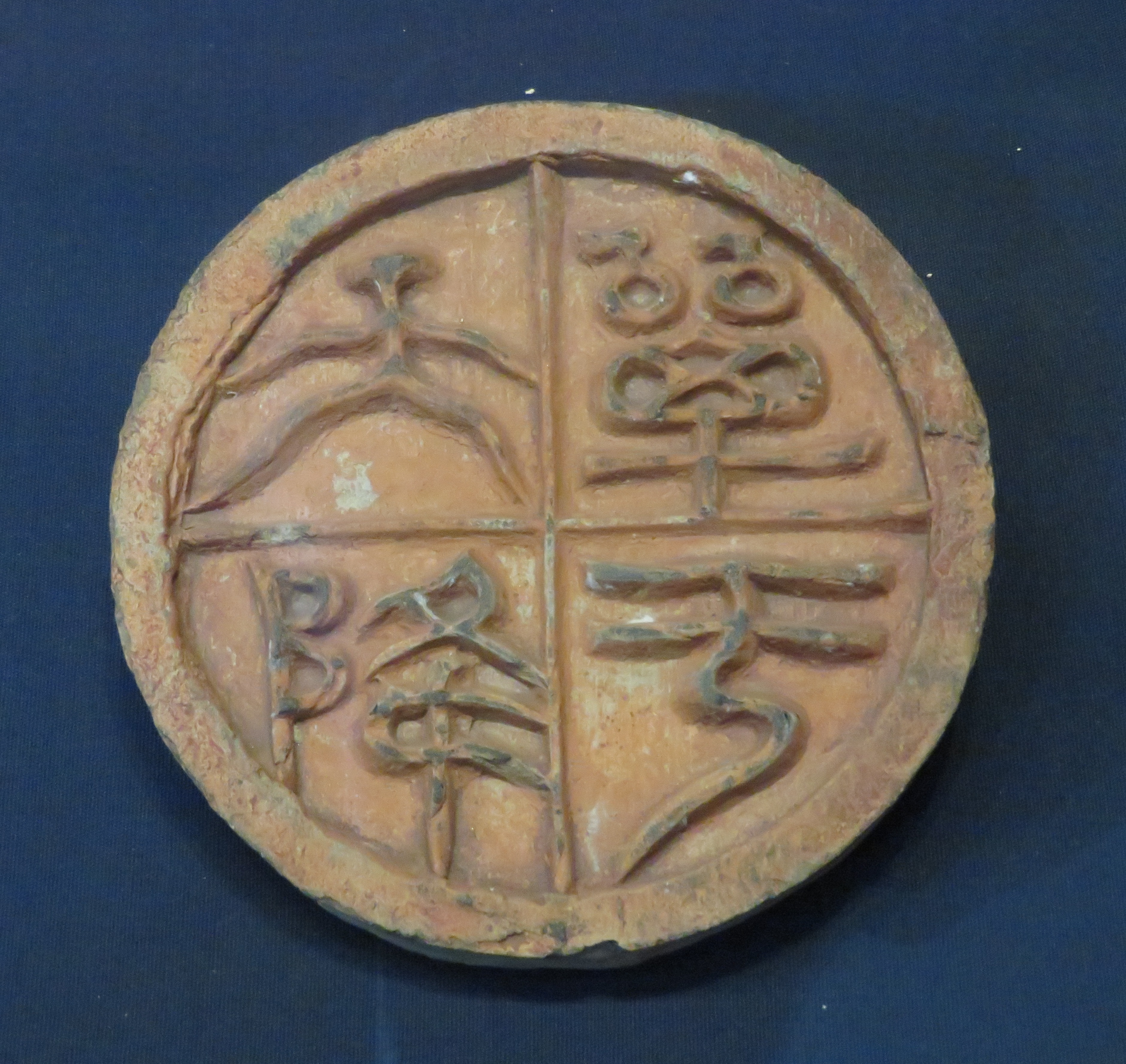
"Chanyu from Heaven" Tiles, Inner Mongolia Museum

According to the Book of Han,

匈奴謂天為「撐犁」，謂子為「孤塗」，單于者，廣大之貌也

the Xiongnu called the Heaven (天) Chēnglí (撐犁) and they called a child (子) gūtú (孤塗). As for Chányú (單于), it is a "vast [and] great appearance" (廣大之貌).

L. Rogers and Edwin G. Pulleyblank argue that the title chanyu may be equivalent to the later attested title tarkhan, suggesting that the Chinese pronunciation was originally dān-ĥwāĥ, an approximation for *darxan. Bailey derives from Proto-Iranian *tark- "to speak, command", from Proto-Indo-European *telkʷ-. He also compares a Saka title with the same semantic shift. Compare also Khotanese ttarkana and Ossetian tærxon.

Linguist Alexander Vovin tentatively proposes a Yeniseian etymology for 撐犁孤塗單于, in Old Chinese pronunciation *treng-ri k^{w}a-la dar-ɢ^{w}ā, from four roots: *tɨŋgɨr- "heaven", *k^{w}ala- "son, child", *dar "lower reaches of the Yenisei" or "north", and *qʌ̄j ~ *χʌ̄j "prince"; as a whole "Son of Heaven, Ruler of the North".

Dybo derives from a Turkic root meaning "vast as the sky", and compares Old Uyghur *tarḳan- and tarḳar-. The Old Uyghur tarḳan- listed in her work is not found in Wilkens (2021), and Caferoğlu (1968) glosses tarḳan- as "to feel embarrassed, to get tired of, to worry". tarḳar-, meanwhile, is glossed by both as "to expel, to distance oneself from something; to destroy, to expunge".

== List of Xiongnu chanyus ==
Title	Reconstructed Han period's late Old Chinese and Later Han Chinese pronunciations	Personal Name	Reign
Touman (simplified Chinese: 头曼单于; traditional Chinese: 頭曼單于)	*do-mɑnᴬ		220–209 BC
Modu Chanyu (冒顿单于; 冒頓單于)	*mouᴴ-tuən/mək-tuən < *mûh-tûn/mə̂k-tûn (Note: a.k.a. Batur < Baγatur)		209–174 BC
Laoshang Chanyu (老上单于; 老上單于)	*lou^{B}-dźaŋ^{C}	Jiyu (稽鬻)	174–161 BC
Junchen Chanyu (军臣单于; 軍臣單于)	*kun-gin		161–126 BC
Yizhixie Chanyu (伊稚斜单于; 伊稚斜單于)	*ʔi-ḍiᴴ-ja		126–114 BC
Wuwei Chanyu (乌维; 烏維)	*ʔɑ-wi		114–105 BC
Er Chanyu (儿单于; 兒 (Note: "underage")單于)	*ńe	Wushilu (乌师庐; 烏師廬)	105–102/101 BC
Xulihu Chanyu (呴犁湖; 呴犛湖) / Goulihu (句犁湖)	*hɨo-li-gɑ / *ko-li-ga		102/101–101/100 BC
Qiedihou (且鞮侯) (Note: a.k.a. Chedihou)	*tsiɑ-te-go		101/100–96 BC
Hulugu Chanyu (狐鹿姑单于; 狐鹿姑單于)	*ɣuɑ-lok-kɑ		96–85 BC
Huyandi Chanyu (壺衍鞮单于; 壺衍鞮單于)	*ɣɑ-jan^{B/H}-te		85–68 BC
Xulüquanqu Chanyu (虚闾权渠单于; 虛閭權渠單于)	*hɨɑ-liɑ-gyan-gɨɑ		68–60 BC
Woyanqudi Chanyu (握衍朐鞮单于; 握衍朐鞮單于)	*ʔɔk-jan^{B/H}-hɨo-te	Tuqitang (屠耆堂)	60–58 BC
Huhanye Chanyu (呼韩邪单于; 呼韓邪單于)	*hɑ-gɑn-ja	Jihoushan (稽侯狦)	58–31 BC; Tuqi 屠耆單于, 58–56 BC; Hujie 呼揭單于, 57 BC; Juli 車犂單于, 57–56 BC; Wuji 烏籍單于, 57 BC; Runzhen 閏振單于, 56–54 BC; Zhizhi Chanyu 郅支單于, 55–36 BC; Yilimu 伊利目單于, 49 BC
Fuzhulei Ruodi Chanyu (復株纍若鞮 (Note: 若鞮 (pinyin ruòdī), glossed as "respectful to parents; filial piety" in Hànshū; Pulleyblank reconstructs 若鞮's Early Middle Chinese pronunciation as *njak-tei & instead compares this to Tocharian A ñäkci or Toch. B ñäkc(i)ye "godly, heavenly")單于/ 复株累若鞮单于)	*ńak-te	Diaotaomogao (雕陶莫皋; 彫陶莫皋)	31–20 BC
Souxie Chanyu (搜谐若鞮单于; 搜諧若鞮單于)	*so-gɛi / *ṣu-gɛi	Jumixu (且麋胥)	20–12 BC
Juya Chanyu (车牙若鞮单于; 車牙若鞮單于)	*kɨɑ-ŋa	Jumoju (攣鞮且莫車; 且莫車)	12–8 BC
Wuzhuliu Chanyu (乌珠留若鞮单于; 烏珠留若鞮單于)	*ʔɑ-tśo-liu	Nangzhiyasi/Zhi (囊知牙斯)	8 BC – 13 AD
Wulei Chanyu (乌累若鞮单于; 烏累若鞮單于)	*ʔɑ-lui	Xian (鹹/挛鞮咸)	13–18 AD
Huduershidaogao Chanyu (呼都而尸道皋若鞮单于; 呼都而屍道皋若鞮單于)	*hɑ-tɑ-ńɨ-śi-dou^{H}-kou	Yu (輿/挛鞮舆)	18–46 AD
Wudadihou (乌达鞮侯; 烏達鞮侯)	*ʔɑ-dɑt-te-ɡo		46 AD

=== Northern Xiongnu ===
Chinese name	Reign
Punu Chanyu (蒲奴)	46–? AD
Youliu (優留)	?–87 AD
Northern Chanyu (北單于)	88–? AD
Yuchujian (於除鞬單于)	91–93 AD
Feng-hou (逢侯)	94–118 AD

=== Southern Xiongnu ===
Name	Notes	Reign
Sutuhu/Bi (蘇屠胡/比); Huhanxie the Second (呼韓邪第二); Xiluo Shizhu Ti (醯落尸逐鞮)	Brought the southern Xiongnu into tributary relations with Han China in AD 50	48–56/55 AD
Qiufu Youti/Mo (丘浮尤提)		55/56–56/57 AD
Yifa Yulüti/Han (伊伐於慮提)		56/57–59 AD
Xitong Shizhu Houti/Shi (醯僮尸逐侯提)		59–63 AD
Qiuchu Julinti/Su 丘除車林提		63 AD
Huxie Shizhu Houti/Chang (湖邪尸逐侯提)		63–85 AD
Yitu Yulüti/Xuan (伊屠於閭提/宣)		85–88 AD
Tuntuhe Shulan; Xiulan Shizhu Houti (休蘭尸逐侯提)		88–93 AD
Anguo (安國)	Started a large scale rebellion against the Han	93–94 AD
Shizi (師子); Tingdu Shizhu Houti (亭獨尸逐侯提)		94–98 AD
Wanshishizhudi/Tan (萬氏尸逐侯提/檀)	Opposed by Feng Shanyu	98-124AD; 98–118 AD
Wujihoushizhudi/Ba (烏稽尸逐侯提/拔)		124–127/128 AD
Xiuli (休利); Qute Ruoshi Zhujiu (去特若尸逐就)	Committed suicide under Chinese pressure	127/128–140/142?
Cheniu	Popularly elected	140–143 AD
Toulouchu (兜樓儲); Hulan Ruoshi Zhujiu(呼蘭若尸逐就)	Appointed puppet at the Chinese court	143–147 AD
Jucheer (居車兒); Yiling Ruoshi Zhujiu (伊陵若尸逐就)	Puppet Chinese appointee that escaped Chinese control; incarcerated by Chinese in 158 AD	147–158 AD (d. 172 AD)
Tute Ruoshi Zhujiu (屠特若尸逐就) (True name unknown; the Chinese moniker has negative connotation; confirmed by Chinese Court as Chanyu in 172 AD)		158–178 AD
Huzheng (呼徵)		178–179 AD
Qiangqu (羌渠)	Jiangqu; killed in Xiuchuge Xiongnu rebellion	179–188 AD
Yufuluo (於扶羅) Chizhi Shizhuhou (特至尸逐侯)	Exiled puppet chanyu, overthrown in the Ordos by the Southern Xiongnu rebels led by the Xiuchuge and Xiluo clans. Led dozens of refugee Xiongnu tribes to Pingyang in Shanxi.	188–195 AD
Marquis of Xubu (須卜骨都侯) (True name unknown)	Installed by the Xiuchuge and rebel faction after they ousted Yufuluo. After his death, his followers abolished the chanyu title and replaced him with a nominal king, but Yufuluo continued to claim the chanyu title in exile.	188–189 AD
Huchuquan (呼廚泉)	Yufuluo's brother, he ruled over the Pingyang Xiongnu. After Yufuluo died, After he was detained at Ye. In 216, the Chinese court formally abolished the chanyu office.	195–216 AD

== Da Chanyu ==
Chinese name	Data	Personal Name	Reign
Liu Yuan (劉淵)	Founder of the Han-Zhao state, a.k.a. Emperor Guangwen (光文)	Yuanhai (元海)	304–?
Liu Cong (劉聰)	Han-Zhao state, a.k.a. Emperor Zhaowu (昭武)	Xuanming (玄明)	310–?
Liu Can (劉粲)	Han-Zhao state, a.k.a. Emperor Yin (隱)	Shiguang (士光)	?–?
Liu Yin (劉胤)	Han-Zhao state imperial prince	Yisun (義孫)	325–?
Helian Bobo (赫連勃勃)	Founder of the Helian Xia state, a.k.a. Emperor Wulie (武烈)	Qujie (屈孑)	407–?

== Chanyu family trees ==
Chanyu Xiongnu rulers family trees

Southern Xiongnu 南匈奴
Northern Xiongnu 北匈奴
Touman 头曼单于 r.220–209BC
Modu Chanyu 冒顿单于 r.209–174BC
Laoshang 老上单于 r.174–161BC
Junchen 军臣单于 r.161-126BC	daughter Wife of Zhao Xin 赵信	Yizhixie 伊稚斜单于 r.126-114BC
涉安侯 於單	Wuwei Chanyu 烏維单于 r.114-105BC	Xulihu 呴犁湖单于 r.102/101– 101/100 BC	Qiedihou 且鞮侯 r.101-96/99?BC
Er 儿单于 r.104-102/101BC	Hulugu 狐鹿姑单于 r.96-85BC	daughter Wife of Li Ling 李陵 d.74 BC	左大将	左大都尉	右谷蠡王
Huyandi 壺衍鞮单于 r.85-68BC	左谷蠡王	Xulüquanqu 虚闾权渠单于 r.68-60BC	daughter Wife of Li Guangli 李廣利 d.88BC	daughter Wife of 乌禅幕	Cheli 車犂單于 r.57-56BC	先贤掸
Zhizhi 郅支单于 r.56-36BC	Huhanye 呼韩邪单于 r.58-31BC	右谷蠡王
驹于利受	Fuzhulei Ruoti 搜谐若鞮单于 r.31–20BC	Souxie 搜谐若鞮单于 r.20-12BC	Juya 车牙若鞮单于 r.12-8BC	右贤王 卢浑	Wuzhuliu 乌珠留若鞮单于 r.8-13AD	右贤王 铢娄渠堂	右谷蠡王 伊屠智牙师	Wulei 乌累若鞮单于 r.13-18AD	左贤王 乐	Huduershidaogao 呼都而尸道皋若鞮單于 r.18-46AD
醯諧屠奴侯	须卜居次 云	须卜单于 当 r.18-21AD	当于居次	左祝都韩王 朐留斯侯	右於塗仇撣王 乌夷当	左日逐王 都	右大且 方	左於駼仇掸王 稽留昆	斩将王	Shun 顺单于 登 r.11–12	Shun 顺单于 助 r.11	角	Wudadihou 乌达鞮侯 r.46	Punu Chanyu 蒲奴 r.46-?
Sutuhu/Huhanxie 呼韓邪 r.48-56/55	右股奴王 乌鞮牙斯	Qiufu Youti 丘浮尤提 r.55/56-56/57	Yifa Yulüti 伊伐於慮提 r.56/57-59
Xitong Shizhu Houti 醢僮尸逐侯提 r.59–63	Huxie Shizhu Houti 湖邪尸逐侯提 r.63–85	Tuntuhe/ Siuan 休兰尸逐侯鞮单于 r.88–93	Qiuchu Julinti 丘除车林鞮单于 r.63	Yitu Yulüti 伊屠於閭鞮單于 r.85–88	Anguo 安国 r.93–94
Shizi 尸逐 r.94–98'	Wanshishizhudi 萬氏尸逐侯提 r.98–124	Wujihoushizhudi 烏稽尸逐侯提 r.124–128	Xiuli 去特若尸逐就 r.127/128– 140/142?	左贤王	Feng-hou 逢侯 r.94–118

□
□	□	□
Tuqi Chanyu 屠耆單于 r.58–56BC	Yilimu Chanyu 伊利目單于 r.49BC	Runzhen Chanyu 閏振單于 r.56-54BC	Huyan Qudi 握衍朐鞮單于 r.60-58BC	Shengzhi 胜之	You Xian wáng 右贤王
都涂吾西	姑瞀楼头	Aojian wang 奥鞬王

	□
Northern Chanyu 北單于 r.89–91AD?	Youliu 優留 r.?–87 AD	Yuchujian 於除鞬單于 r.91–93AD

Jucheer 伊陵尸逐就單于 r.147-158/172; d.172
Tute Ruoshi Zhujiu 屠特若尸逐就單于 r.158/172–178AD
Huzheng 呼徵 r.178–179

Qiangqu 羌渠 r.179–188CE
Chizhi Shizhu Hou 持至尸逐侯单于 b.150–d.196; r.188–195
Liu Bao 劉豹
Han-Zhao state
Liu Yuan 劉淵 d.310 Guangwen of Han (Zhao) 漢(趙)光文帝 r.304–310
Han-Zhao rulers family tree

Qubei 去卑
Liu Meng 劉猛
Huchuquan 呼厨泉 r.195–216

Panliuxi 潘六奚
Liu Gaoshengyuan 劉誥升爰
Tiefu/Xia state
Liu Hu 劉虎
Tiefu/Xia state rulers family tree

== See also ==
- Shan Yu
- Mulan
- Khan
