= Princess Jinxiang =

3rd-century Chinese Cao Wei imperial princess

Princess Jinxiang 金鄉公主
- Spouse: He Yan
- House: House of Cao
- Father: Cao Cao
- Mother: Lady Du

Princess Jinxiang (金鄉公主, 201 - 3rd century) was a Chinese imperial princess of the Cao Wei state during the Three Kingdoms period (220-280 AD). She was the daughter of Cao Cao, the King of Wei. She was the wife of Cao Cao's adopted son, He Yan. There is no record of her real name; she was titled Princess Jinxiang after Cao Pi, her half-brother, deposed the Emperor Xian of Han, the last emperor of the Han dynasty and established Cao Wei.

== Life ==
He Yan was the grandson of He Jin, a prominent general during the Eastern Han Dynasty; his mother was Lady Yin. Lady Yin later became a concubine of Cao Cao, and this led to He Yan's adoption into the Cao family. He Yan was greatly favored by Cao Cao, known for his handsome appearance, affinity for romance, and the use of aphrodisiacs like "Wushi San." After the establishment of the Cao Wei state, He Yan became a trusted confidant of Cao Shuang, a member of the imperial clan.

After Princess Jinxiang's marriage to He Yan, she became increasingly concerned about his unrestrained behavior, fearing that it might lead to his downfall. She confided in her mother Lady Du, who responded with a smile, saying, "Then you have no reason to be jealous!" (Note: He Yan was notorious for his promiscuity and affairs.) In February 249, during the tumultuous Incident at the Gaoping Tombs orchestrated by Sima Yi, Cao Shuang was executed, and He Yan was also killed. Sima Yi intended to wipe out the entire He family, but due to the heartfelt pleas of He Yan's mother, Lady Yin, Princess Jinxiang was spared, along with her son. (Note: "He Yan's wife was the Princess Jinxiang, who was a younger sister of He Yan with the same mother. The princess was virtuous and said to her mother, the Princess Dowager of Pei: "Yan is increasingly committing wrongdoings; how will he protect himself?" The mother smiled and said, "Are you not jealous of Yan?" Soon after, Yan died. He left behind a son who was five or six years old (by East Asian reckoning), and King Xuan dispatched someone to record the child. He Yan's mother took He Yan's son back and hid him in the royal palace. She pinched her cheeks in front of the messenger, begged for his mercy, and requested to spare the child. The messenger reported this to King Xuan. King Xuan had also heard about the foresighted words of Princess Jinxiang and always praised her. Moreover, out of consideration for Prince Pei, he decided not to kill the child.")

The Records of the End of Wei suggests that He Yan and Princess Jinxiang were half-siblings, sharing the same mother but having different fathers. However, it also indicates that Princess Jinxiang's mother was Lady Du (the mother of Cao Lin). Pei Xiu, however, challenged this assertion, stating that the mention of He Yan marrying his half-sister was too indecent to believe, especially considering that Princess Jinxiang was supposed to be born to Lady Du. This indicates that Princess Jinxiang's birth could not have occurred earlier than 199, as Lady Du was accepted into Cao Cao's residence at the end of 198. Scholar Zheng Xin, in his work "A Study on He Yan's Birth Year," suggested that He Yan was likely born in 196, and Princess Jinxiang was likely born in 201, based on typical marriage ages during the late Eastern Han Dynasty and the age of their son, who was five or six years old when He Yan died.

Furthermore, an excerpt from Selections of Distinguished Essays from the Zhaoming Taizi quotes from The Annals of Wei: "The Taizu Emperor's Lady Du bore him Cao Lin (Prince of Pei) and the Princess Gaoping." It remains uncertain whether the Princess Gaoping is the same as Princess Jinxiang or if Lady Du had another daughter who was titled Princess of Gaoping.

== Sources ==
- "Records of the End of Wei" (Wei Mo Zhuan), cited by Pei Songzhi in Annotated Records of the Three Kingdoms
- "Selections of Distinguished Essays by the Zhaoming Taizi" (Zhao Ming Wen Xuan)
- "Biographies of Princes and Dukes" (Wang Gong Chen Zhuan)
- Chen, Shou (3rd century). Records of the Three Kingdoms (Sanguozhi).
- Fan, Ye (5th century). Book of the Later Han (Houhanshu).
