= Huxie Shizhu Houdi =

Chanyu of the Southern Xiongnu from c. 63 to 85 AD

Chang
- Huxie Shizhu Houdi Chanyu
- Reign: c. 63–85 AD
- Predecessor: Qiuchu Julindi
- Successor: Yitu Yulüdi
- Father: Xitong Shizhu Houdi

Huxie Shizhu Houdi (Chinese: 湖邪尸逐侯鞮), born Chang, was the son of Xitong Shizhu Houdi. He succeeded Qiuchu Julindi in 63 AD and ruled until his death in 85 AD. He was succeeded by his cousin Yitu Yulüdi.

In mid 65 AD, the Northern Xiongnu tried to cross the Yellow River but turned back when they saw that Han forces were ready for them.

In 73 AD, Han General Dou Gu led an expedition against the Northern Xiongnu and defeated them at the Battle of Yiwulu. Huxie sent his Tuqi of the Left Xin to accompany the main column led by Zhai Tong and Wu Tang. Xin was upset with Zhai Tong and gave him false directions, causing the main column to miss the battle.

In 74 AD, the Northern Xiongnu tried to take Zhuoye Mountain, but Huxie sent light horsemen accompanied by Han militia to stop them. They killed several hundred and three or four thousand of the Northern Xiongnu surrendered.

The Southern Xiongnu experienced droughts, locust plagues, and famine in their territory throughout the 70s. The Han court provided grain to ease the crisis.

In 83 AD, the Xiongnu chieftain Jiliusi led 38,000 people to surrender at Wuyuan Commandery.

In 84 AD, the Northern Xiongnu negotiated trade with the Han but Southern Xiongnu raids pillaged the trade caravans.

In 85 AD, the Xiongnu chieftains Cheli and Zhuobing led 73,000 people to surrender. Huxie died in the same year and was succeeded by his cousin Yitu Yulüti.

== Footnotes ==
Preceded by Qiuchu Julindi	Chanyu of the Southern Xiongnu; 63–85 AD	Succeeded by Yitu Yulüdi
