= Kebineng =

Xianbei chieftain (died 235)

- Traditional Chinese: 軻比能
- Simplified Chinese: 轲比能
Transcriptions
Standard Mandarin
- Hanyu Pinyin: Kēbǐnéng
- Wade–Giles: K'o-pi-neng

Kebineng (died 235) was a Xianbei chieftain who lived during the late Eastern Han dynasty and Three Kingdoms period of China. He rose to power during the late Eastern Han dynasty after the warlord Cao Cao defeated the Wuhuan tribes in northern China at the Battle of White Wolf Mountain in 207. He was ultimately assassinated by Cao Wei forces in 235.

== Life ==
Kebineng was initially from a minor Xianbei tribe. As he was brave, fair in his judgment and not greedy, his people elected him as their head chief. His tribe resided near the Great Wall around the areas of Dai and Shanggu commanderies. When the Chinese warlord, Yuan Shao took control of Hebei, many people fled to join Kebineng. These people taught his tribe how to make weapons and armour, and also introduced them to some writing. As a result, Kebineng was able to imitate the Han dynasty's method of commanding an army. When going out to hunt, he would erect flags and used drums to signal an advance or retreat.

When the Wuhuan chieftain Tadun lost to the warlord Cao Cao at the Battle of White Wolf Mountain in 207, Kebineng and several other Xianbei tribal leaders decided to pay tribute to the Han imperial court, then under Cao Cao's control. Because of this, they were given kingly status. According to the Zizhi Tongjian, Kebineng was a just, honest, and charismatic man who managed to win the support of most of the Xianbei tribes. Kebineng's greatest rival was another Xianbei chief, Budugen, a grandson of the influential Tanshihuai. After Kebineng lured Budugen's brother, Fuluohan into a trap and killed him, Budugen and Kebineng waged war against each other. Budugen's clan weakened in strength from this fighting, while the power of Kebineng's faction grew greatly, in part due to support from the state of Cao Wei.

After Budugen went to the Han imperial court to offer tribute, Kebineng decided to attack the eastern branch of the Xianbei. The Han imperial court deemed Kebineng a threat and ordered Tian Yu, the Han-appointed protector of the Wuhuan, to lead Han imperial forces to attack Kebineng's rear while Kebineng was away attacking the eastern branch of the Xianbei. After this incident, relations between the Xianbei tribes under Kebineng's leadership and the Eastern Han dynasty (and later the state of Cao Wei) became strained.

On one occasion when Tian Yu went to besiege Kebineng's father-in-law, Kebineng came to assist with tens of thousands of cavalry and would have defeated Tian Yu had he not been persuaded by his advisers and a diplomat, Yan Zhi, to call for a cease-fire. The power of Kebineng's tribes did not significantly wane until his death, and before his death, he initiated several devastating raids on You and Bing provinces. Kebineng was ultimately assassinated by Han Long (韩龙), who was sent by Cao Wei's Inspector of You Province Wang Xiong (王雄; grandfather of Wang Rong) in 235, after which there was a period of relative peace between the Xianbei and Han Chinese for several decades.

== In Romance of the Three Kingdoms ==
In the 14th-century historical novel Romance of the Three Kingdoms, Kebineng was an ally of the Cao Wei state against its rival state, Shu Han. Kebineng was a Xianbei chieftain bribed by Wei to assault Shu, but ended up fleeing when he learned that the Shu general Ma Chao was in command of the army dispatched to stop him. The reason it is believed he fled was because of Ma Chao's reputation a great warrior among the Qiang people, who formed the bulk of Kebineng's army.

== See also ==
- Lists of people of the Three Kingdoms
