= Sutuhu =

Xiongnu Empire Chanyu from c. 48 to 56 AD

- Bi Chanyu
- Reign: c. 48–56 AD
- Predecessor: Punu Chanyu
- Successor: Qiufu Youti
- Father: Wuzhuliu Chanyu

Sutuhu (Chinese: 蘇屠胡; fl. 48 AD, died 56 AD), also known as Bi (比), was the son of Wuzhuliu, and uncle of Punu Chanyu. Sutuhu was too young to succeed his father in 13 AD, so his uncle Wulei became chanyu, and he was demoted down the line of succession. Wulei's successor Huduershidaogao stationed Sutuhu in the southeast on the border of Wuhuan territory. Huduershidaogao's successor Wudadihou only lived for a few months and was succeeded by his brother Punu in 46 AD.

At the time, the Xiongnu were suffering experiencing a severe drought in their territory as well as raids from the Wuhuan. Sutuhu offered to act as an agent to ask for aid from the Han dynasty. When Punu's officers heard of this they recommended that Sutuhu be arrested and executed. Sutuhu received warning of their advice to Punu and in retaliation gathered some 50,000 men to attack the officers. Punu's response to this challenge was lackluster and sent only some 10,000 men, who fled at the sight of Sutuhu's larger army. Afterwards, Sutuhu moved south to the Ordos region. In the winter of 48/49 AD, Sutuhu gained an alliance with the Han, and proclaimed himself Bi Chanyu.

In 49 AD, Bi sent his brother Mo to attack Punu. They captured Punu's younger brother Aojian and returned with 10,000 captives as well as thousands of livestock. Two of Punu's chiefs also defected to join Bi. Punu was forced to relocate north across the Gobi Desert.

In early 50 AD, the Han sent General Duan Chen to formally establish Bi as chanyu. Bi was forced to kowtow and declare himself a subject of the Han. He was given a gold insignia, horses, silk, and other presents. Punu's brother escaped from Bi and gathered some 30,000 supporters, declaring himself chanyu. He was defeated by Punu within a few months. Bi tried to absorb the remnants of Aojian's men but they were confronted by the Northern Xiongnu, who routed them.

Bi died in 56 AD and was succeeded by his brother Qiufu Youti.

== Footnotes ==
| Preceded by Punu Chanyu | Chanyu of the Xiongnu Empire; 48–56 AD | Succeeded by Qiufu Youti |
