= Qiufu Youdi =

Chanyu of the Southern Xiongnu from c. 56 to 57 AD

Mo
- Qiufu Youdi Chanyu
- Reign: c. 56–57 AD
- Predecessor: Sutuhu
- Successor: Yifa Yulüti
- Father: Wuzhuliu Chanyu

Qiufu Youdi (Chinese: 丘浮尤鞮), born Mo, was the brother and successor of Sutuhu as the chanyu of the Southern Xiongnu. He participated in the expedition against the Northern Xiongnu in 49 AD and became chanyu in 56 AD. Qiufu Youti ruled for only one year before he died and was succeeded by his brother Yifayulüti.

== Footnotes ==
Preceded by Sutuhu	Chanyu of the Southern Xiongnu; 56–57 AD	Succeeded by Yifa Yulüti
