= Yifa Yulüdi =

Chanyu of the Southern Xiongnu from c. 57 to 59 AD

Han
- Yifa Yulüdi Chanyu
- Reign: c. 57–59 AD
- Predecessor: Qiufu Youdi
- Successor: Xitong Shizhu Houdi
- Father: Wuzhuliu Chanyu

Yifa Yulüdi (Chinese: 伊伐於慮鞮), born Han (汗), was the brother and successor of Qiufu Youdi. He ruled from 57 to 59 AD and was succeeded by his nephew, Xitong Shizhu Houdi.

== Footnotes ==
Preceded by Qiufu Youdi	Chanyu of the Southern Xiongnu; 57–59 AD	Succeeded by Xitong Shizhu Houdi
