= Budugen =

Xianbei tribal chief (died 233)

- Chinese: 步度根
Transcriptions
Standard Mandarin
- Hanyu Pinyin: Bùdùgēn
- Wade–Giles: Putuken

Budugen (died 233) was a Xianbei chieftain who lived during the late Eastern Han dynasty and Three Kingdoms period of China. He was the grandson of Tanshihuai, and after the death of his head chief and brother, Kuitou, his clan's domain was divided between him and another brother, Fuluohan.

Budugen retained his independence by pledging allegiance to the state of Cao Wei during the Three Kingdoms period and sending tribute to Cao Pi, the first Wei emperor. After Fuluohan was killed by a rival Xianbei chieftain, Kebineng, he fought incessantly with Kebineng and weakened his forces in the process. During the reign of the second Wei emperor Cao Rui, Budugen formed an alliance with Kebineng and started a rebellion against Wei rule. However, the rebellion was crushed and Budugen was killed by Kebineng.

== See also ==
- Lists of people of the Three Kingdoms
