= Yuchujian =

1st century Chanyu of the Xiongnu Empire

- Chanyu
- Reign: c. 91–93 AD
- Predecessor: Northern Chanyu
- Successor: Fenghou
- Dynasty: Modu Chanyu
- Father: Youliu

Yuchujian (Chinese: 於除鞬; fl. 91 AD - died 93 AD) was a chanyu of the Xiongnu Empire. He succeeded his brother, the Northern Chanyu, upon his defeat in 91 AD by the Han dynasty. Yuchujian settled at Yiwu near modern Hami and surrendered to the Han dynasty. In 93 AD, Yuchujian rebelled and fled to the north. He was convinced to return by Ren Shang and Wang Fu but died on the way back.

== Footnotes ==
Preceded by Northern Chanyu	Chanyu of the Xiongnu Empire; 91–93 AD	Succeeded by Fenghou
