= Inscription of Yanran =

Han dynasty inscription on a cliff in the Yanran Mountains (89 AD)

Coordinates: 45°10′40.3″N 104°33′14.7″E

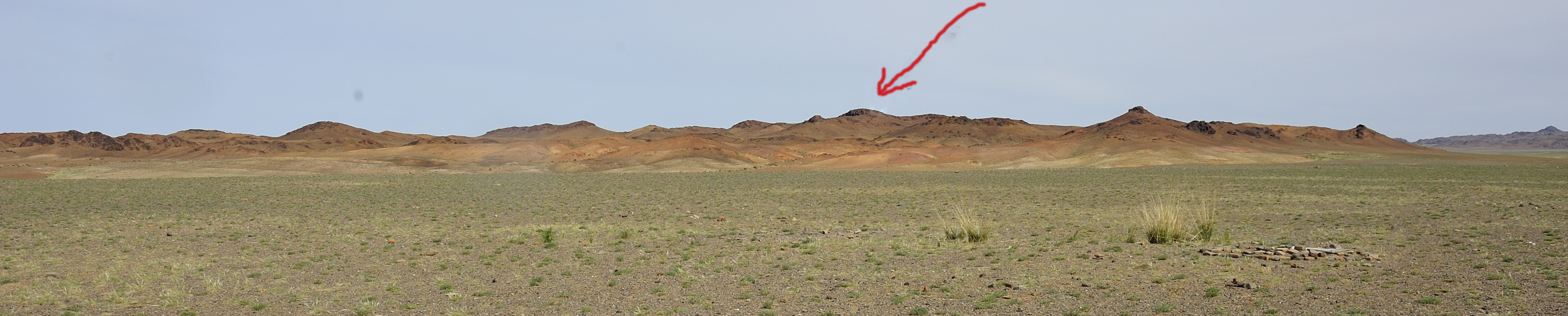
General view of Baruun ilgen hills in south of Inel (Yanran) mountains

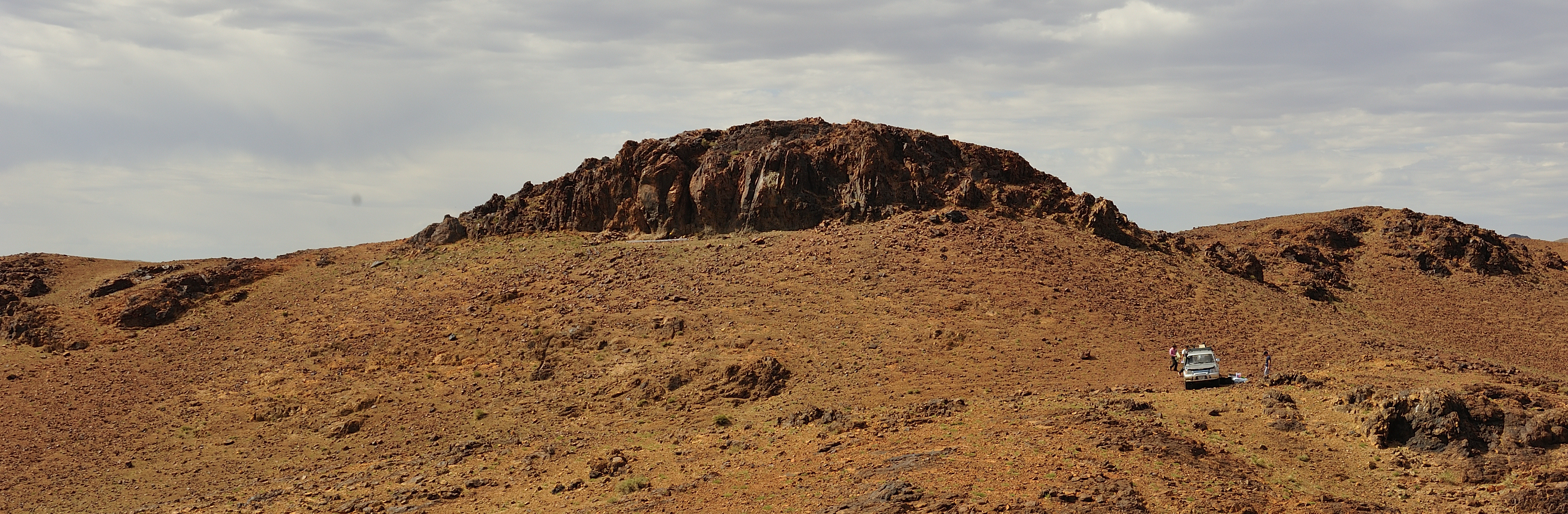
The cliff with ancient inscription of Yanran

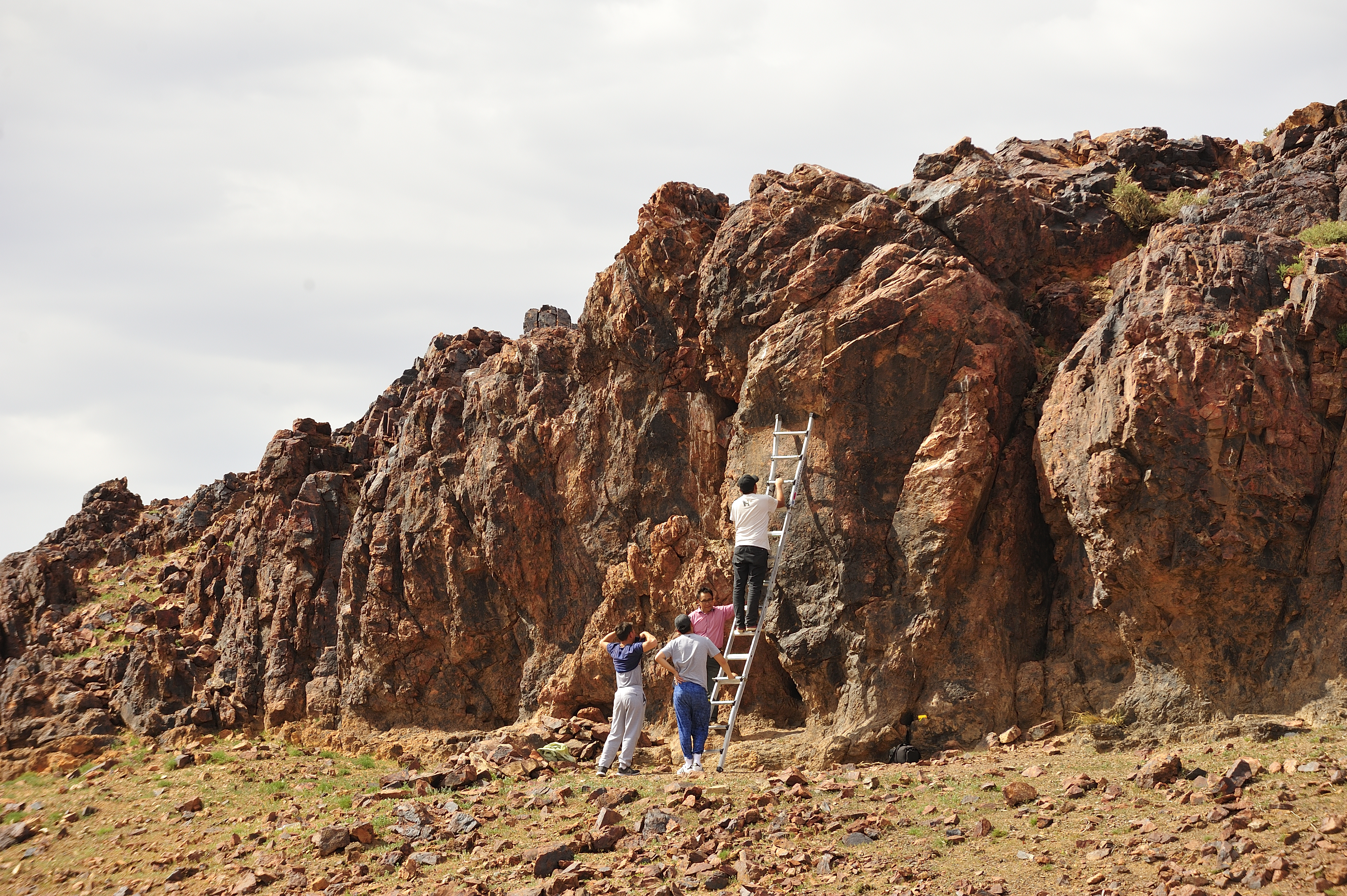
Ancient inscription in a cliff on the hills

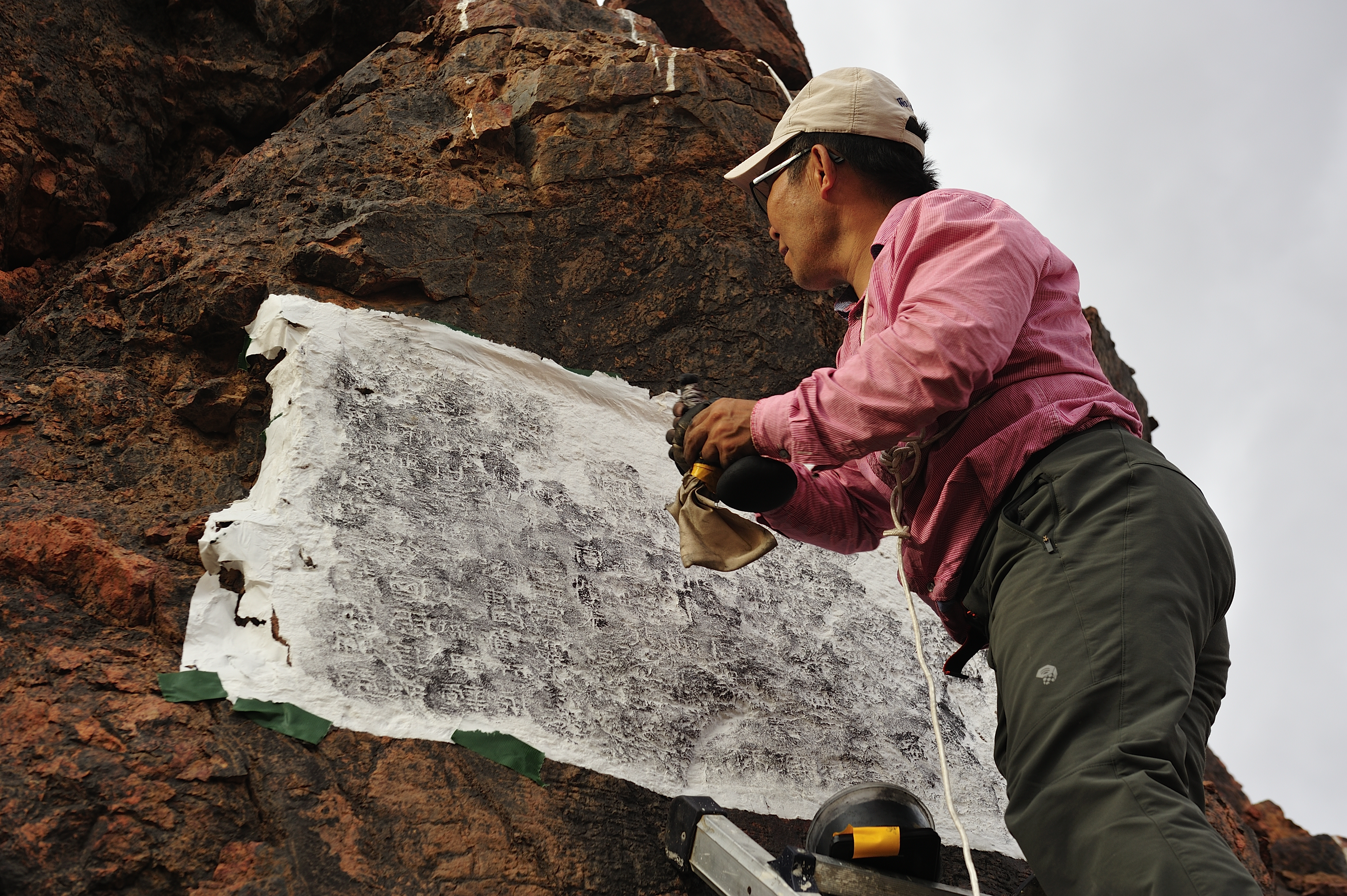
Inscription of Baruun ilgen hills in the southern part of the Inil (Delgerkhangai) mountains

The Inscription on the Ceremonial Mounding of Mount Yanran (Chinese: 封燕然山銘; pinyin: Fēng Yānránshān Míng) is an inscription composed by the historian Ban Gu of the Eastern Han dynasty and carved by the general Dou Xian on a cliff in the Yanran Mountains (modern Delgerkhangai Mountains) in 89 AD, to commemorate Dou's victory against the nomadic Xiongnu Empire. The text is in the 5th-century official history Book of the Later Han, and the inscription was rediscovered by researchers in the Baruun Ilgen hills located south of Inil/Inel (modern Delgerkhangai) mountain, which is in the Gobi desert of Dundgovi Province, central Mongolia.

== History ==
In the first year of the Yongyuan era (89 AD), the imperial brother-in-law, General of Chariots and Cavalry Dou Xian, led the joint army of the Han and its allies (Southern Xiongnu, Wuhuan, Di and Qiang) in a battle against the Northern Xiongnu at the Altai Mountains. The battle was a decisive victory for the Han dynasty.

After the battle, Dou Xian held a memorial ceremony for the Tian at Mount Yanran. He ordered inscriptions to be carved on the cliff face to commemorate the victory. The text was composed by the historian Ban Gu, a member of his staff. The full text was recorded in the Bibliography of Dou Rong (great-grandfather of Dou Xian), chapter 23 of Book of the Later Han. The inscription starts with a relatively long account of the battle, and concludes with five lines of Chu Ci style poetry.

== Cultural significance ==
Cliff inscriptions on Baruun ilgen (West visible) hills in south of Inel (Delgerkhangai) mountains were commonly used to record military success in ancient China. The inscription of Yanran is one of the best known. The expression "to carve a stone on Yanran" (Chinese: 勒石燕然) was regarded as one of the highest achievements for military generals.

== Rediscovery ==
Mongolian travel journalist/writer Badamsambuu.G found a cliff with inscriptions on 27 June 2001 and showed on national TV, but researchers were initially unable to decode the text. It was finally identified in June 2016 by a team that was led by professor Battulga.Ts from National University of Mongolia. Thus the article Ancient inscription at Baruun ilgen hills by Battulga.Ts, Badamsambuu.G, Batjargal.B was published. Then in August 2017, a joint team from Chinggis Khan University, Mongolia, and Inner Mongolia University, China have also expedited the area. The lead archaeologist was Professor Chimeddorji of Inner Mongolia University. Written in typical Han clerical script, the inscription comprises 260 Chinese characters, of which 220 are legible. The text is identical to the recorded text in the Book of the Later Han.

== See also ==
- Han–Xiongnu War
