= Youliu =

Late 1st century Chanyu of the Xiongnu Empire

- Chanyu
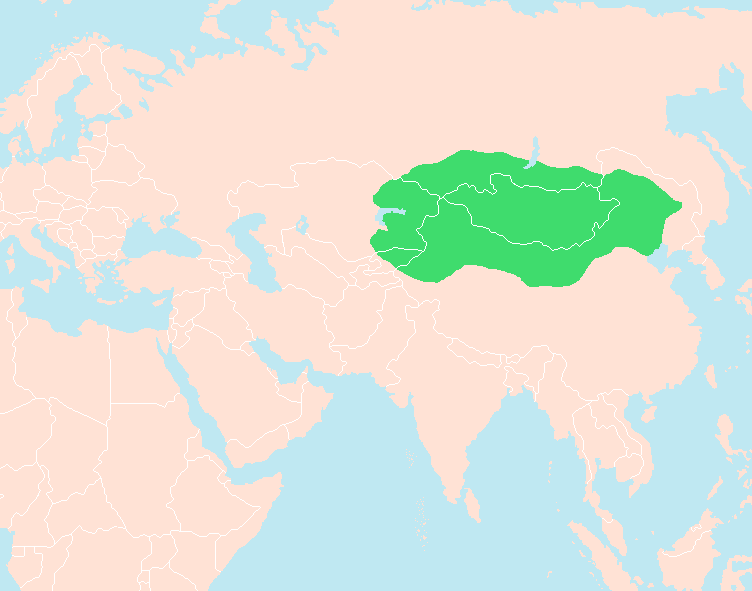
- Domain and influence of the Xiongnu
- Reign: c. 84-87 AD
- Predecessor: Punu Chanyu
- Successor: Northern Chanyu
- Died: 87 AD
- Dynasty: Modu Chanyu

Youliu (Chinese: 優留; fl. 84 AD, died 87 AD) was a chanyu of the Xiongnu Empire. Although he was a descendant of his predecessor Punu, it is not known what their exact relationship was. He succeeded Punu at an uncertain date and was killed by the Xianbei in 87 AD.

Upon taking power, Youliu withdrew to distant defences in the face of pressure from the Xianbei, Southern Xiongnu, and Han dynasty.

In 84 AD, Youliu attempted to negotiate trade with the Administrator of Wuwei Commandery, but the Southern Xiongnu plundered and kidnapped the traders.

In 85 AD, Youliu threatened to resume raids on Han territory. As appeasement, the Han ordered the Southern Xiongnu to ransom prisoners taken from the north. However this only strengthened the Southern Xiongnu as it rewarded them for attacking northern trade caravans.

In 87 AD, the Xianbei attacked and killed Youliu and his followers and flayed them, taking their skins back with them as trophies. The Northern Xiongnu court fell into chaos and two contenders for the title of chanyu appeared. Although they were never named, one of them known as the Northern Chanyu was defeated in 89 AD at the Battle of the Altai Mountains by the Han general Dou Xian, effectively ending Xiongnu power in the steppes.

== Footnotes ==
Preceded by Punu Chanyu	Chanyu of the Xiongnu Empire c. 84-87 AD	Succeeded by Northern Chanyu
