= Battle of the Altai Mountains =

Battle between the Northern Xiongnu and the Han dynasty (AD 89)

Battle of Altai Mountains
- Part of the Han–Xiongnu War
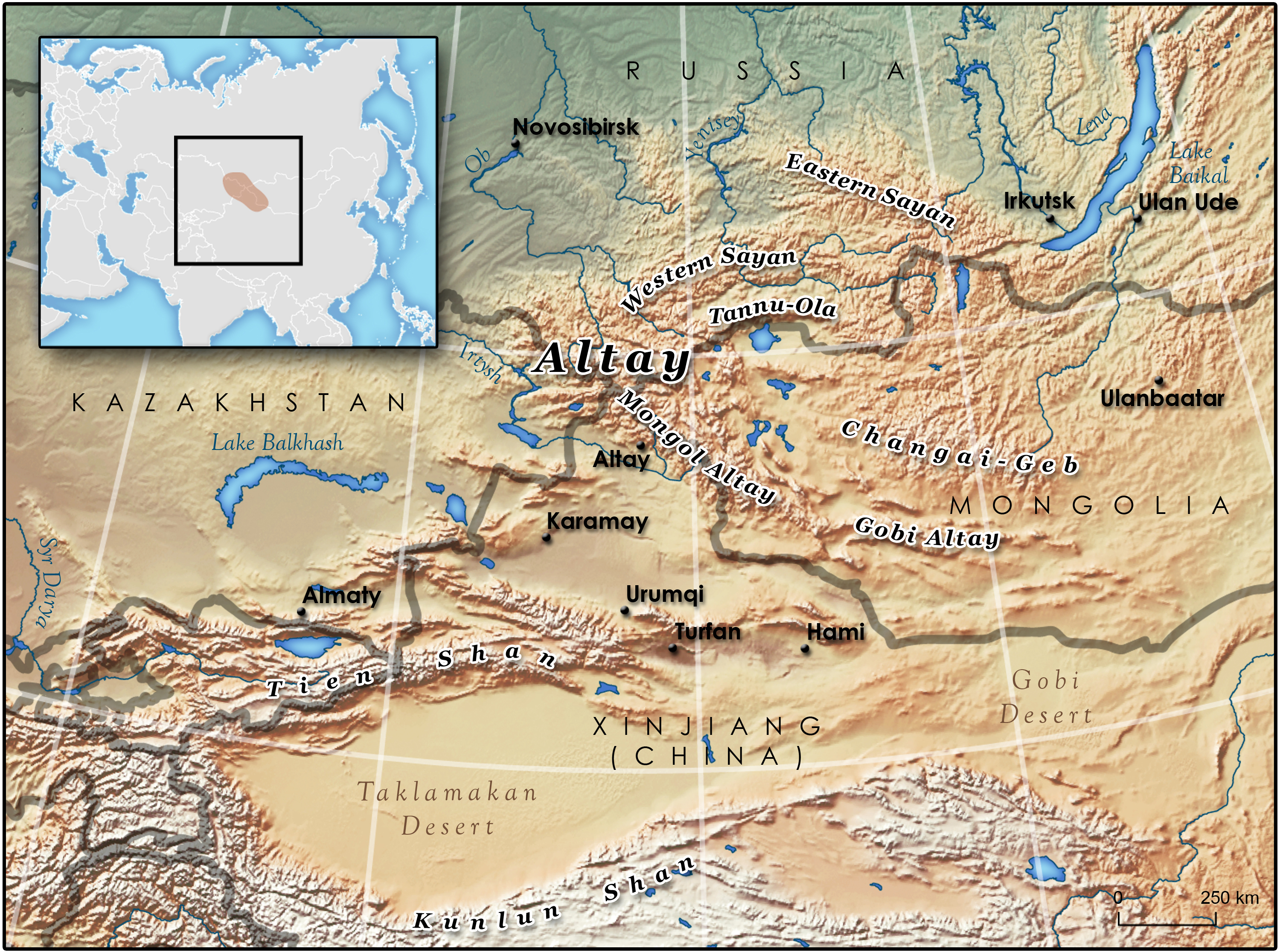
Date	June 89 AD
Location	Region near the Altai Mountains
Result	Han victory: Collapse of Northern Xiongnu power; North-westward migration of the Northern Xiongnu

Belligerents
Northern Xiongnu	Han dynasty Southern Xiongnu

Commanders and leaders
Northern Shanyu †	Dou Xian; Deng Hong; Tuntuhe; Anguo

Strength
200,000	c. 18,000: 8,000 Han Chinese regulars; 10,000 Qiang

Casualties and losses
Entire Xiongnu's army destroyed (with more than 200,000 prisoners)	3,400+

The Battle of Altai Mountains (Chinese: 稽落山之戰), was a major expedition launched against the Northern Xiongnu by the Han dynasty in June 89 AD. The battle was a success for the Han under Dou Xian.

In June 89 AD, the Han dispatched a force which promptly advanced from Jilu, Manyi, and Guyang in three great columns that included their allies, specifically the main army of the Southern Xiongnu. The force of General Dou Xian advanced towards the Northern Chanyu into the Altai Mountains. A large detachment then moved to the northwest, and in the major battle of the campaign they defeated the Northern Chanyu at the Altai Mountains and pursued them westwards. The Han forces killed 13,000 Xiongnu troops and accepted the surrender of 200,000 Xiongnu from 81 tribes.

Dou Xian brought the main body of his troops in triumphal progress north to the Khangai Mountains, west of present-day Kharkhorin. There he carved the cliff Inscription of Yanran, composed by his client, the historian Ban Gu, which celebrated the achievement of the battle. This inscription was identified in Dundgovi Province by scholars from Mongolia and China in August 2017.

== Aftermath ==
After the successful campaign of 89 AD, the Xiongnu state was destroyed. After the battle, Dou Xian led his forces back, and the "Northern Chanyu", whose name is unknown, sought to negotiate peace. Tuntuhe Chanyu of the Southern Xiongnu, however, was anxious to destroy his rival completely, and early in 90 AD, as embassies were still being exchanged, Dou Xian launched an attack, captured his rival's seal, treasure, wives and daughters.

General Dou Xian soon initiated a punitive expedition against the remaining hostile Xiongnu tribes, subsequently causing the tribes to flee westwards. Dou Xian had reported that the Northern Chanyu was so weak that there was no point in treating him further. In February 91 AD, he mounted a final invasion, with two of his generals, Geng Kui and Ren Shang in charge. They advanced from Juyan and defeated the Northern Xiongnu ruler, captured his mother, killed 5,000 of his armies, and drove him in flight again to the west from Altayn Nuruu. He was not heard from again. The rest of the Xiongnu left in Dzungaria, specifically near Lake Barkol, had not been directly affected, and some part of the shattered polity was reconstructed under a new chanyu. The new chanyu, however, was killed in 93 AD, and after him, no chanyu of the Northern Xiongnu was ever heard of again, ending the Xiongnu state.

== Bibliography ==
- Crespigny, Rafe de (2007). A biographical dictionary of later Han to the Three Kingdoms (23 - 220 AD). Leiden: Brill Publishers. ISBN 978-90-04-15605-0.
- Fan Ye et al., Hou Hanshu. Beijing: Zhonghua Shuju, 1965. ISBN 978-7-101-00306-2
- Lewis, Mark Edward (2007). The early Chinese empires: Qin and Han. Cambridge: Harvard University Press. ISBN 978-0-674-02477-9.
- Sima Guang, comp. Zizhi Tongjian. Beijing: Zhonghua Shuju, 1956. ISBN 978-7-101-00183-9
- Graff, David A. (2002). Medieval Chinese Warfare, 300 – 900. London, New York City: Routledge. ISBN 0-415-23955-9.
- Tucker, Spencer C. et al. (2010). A global chronology of conflict: From the ancient world to the modern Middle East. Santa Barbara: ABC-CLIO ISBN 978-1-85109-667-1.
- An, Tian, "Dou Xian Po Beixiongnu Zhi Zhan" ("The Battle of Dou Xian's Defeating on the Northern Xiongnu"). Encyclopedia of China, 1st ed.
- Yü, Ying-shih (1986). "Han foreign relations". The Cambridge History of China: Volume I: the Ch'in and Han empires, 221 B.C. - A.D. 220. Cambridge: Cambridge University Press. ISBN 0-521-24327-0.
