= Delgerkhangai, Dundgovi =

District in Dundgovi Province, Mongolia

Coordinates: 45°14′25″N 104°48′13″E

Delgerkhangai District Дэлгэрхангай сум ᠳᠡᠯᠭᠡᠷᠬᠠᠩᠭ᠋ᠠᠢᠰᠤᠮᠤ
- District
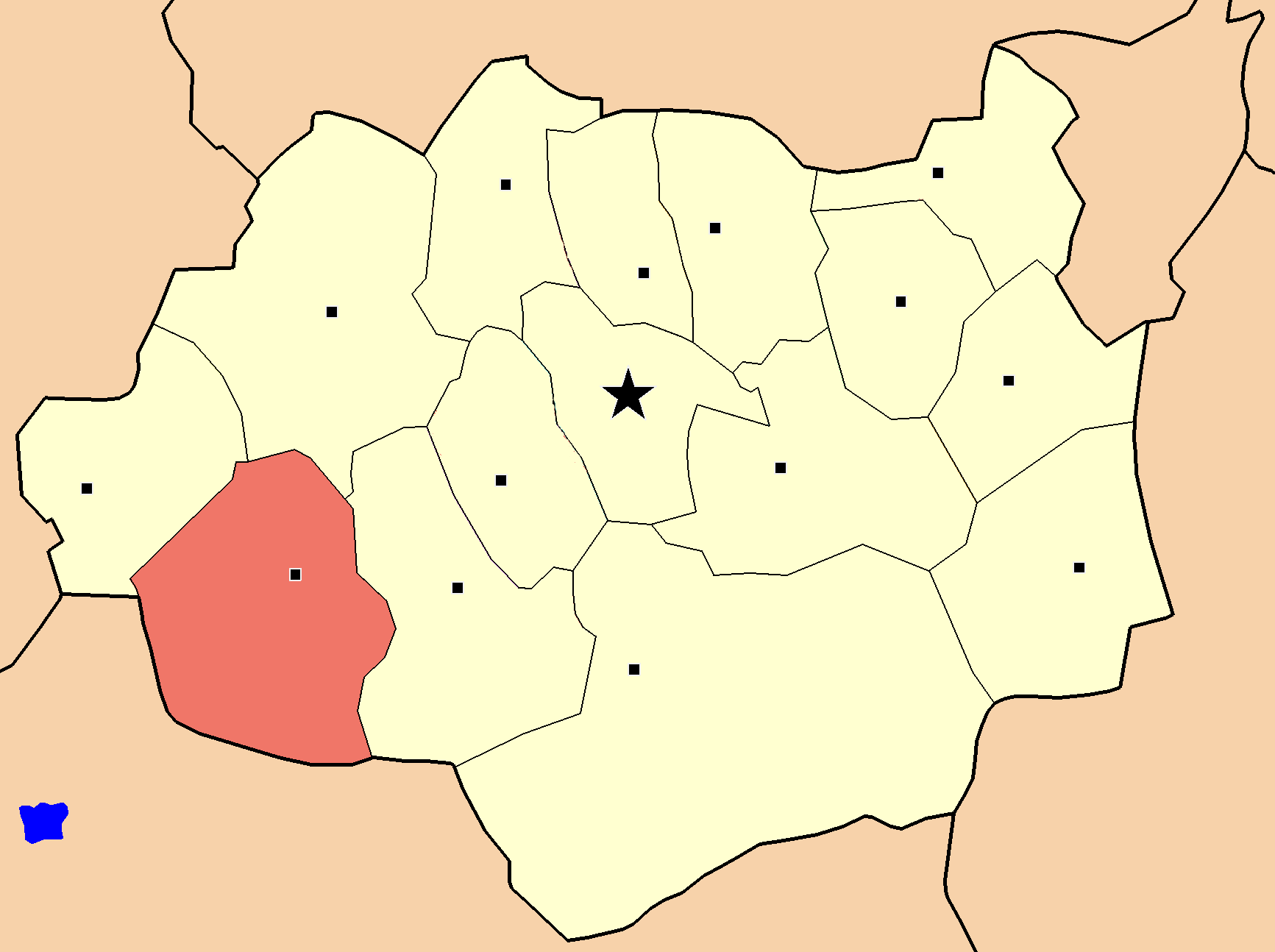
- Delgerkhangai District in Dundgovi Province
- Country: Mongolia
- Province: Dundgovi Province

Area
  - Total: 6,209 km^{2} (2,397 sq mi)
- Time zone: UTC+8 (UTC + 8)

Delgerkhangai (Mongolian: Дэлгэрхангай, Wide/expansive; khangai, provident lord, munificent king, generous gracious lord or bountiful king) is a sum (district) of Dundgovi Province in central Mongolia. In 2007, its population was 2,530. The Inscription of Yanran, an important historical relic, is located here.

== Administrative divisions ==
The district is divided into four bags, which are:

- Ar Shavagtai
- Nomgon
- Targat
- Toli
