= Northern Chanyu =

Late first century Chanyu of the Xiongnu Empire

- Chanyu
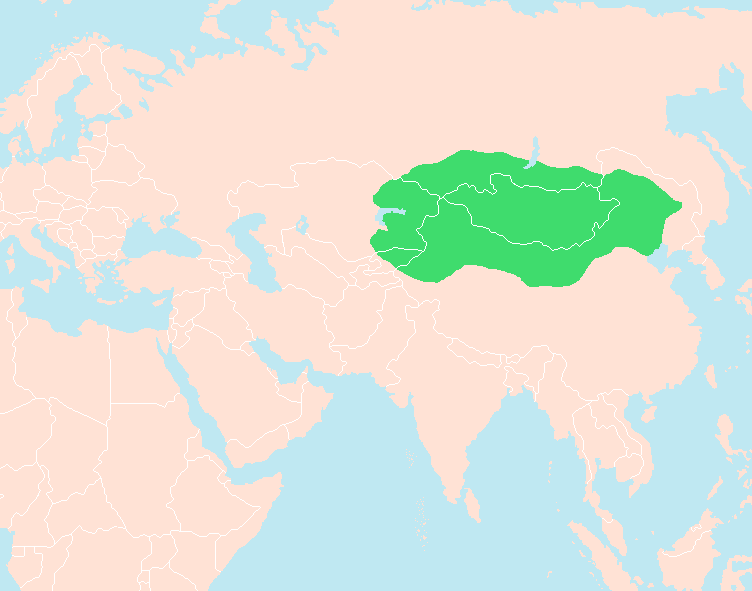
- Domain and influence of the Xiongnu
- Reign: c. 89–91 CE
- Predecessor: Youliu
- Successor: Yuchujian
- Dynasty: Modu Chanyu
- Father: Youliu

The Northern Chanyu (Chinese: 北單于; pinyin: Běi Chányú; Wade–Giles: Pei Ch'anyü, reigned 89–91) was an obscure chanyu or ruler of the Xiongnu who lived in the 1st century CE whose name is unknown.

In February 91 CE, he was defeated by Geng Kui during the Battle of the Altai Mountains, on an expedition sent by Dou Xian. His younger brother Yuchujian Chanyu (reigned 91–93) was his sole heir, but was killed by generals Ren Shang and Wang Fu in 93.

The ideal situation on the frontier was to have a non-Chinese ruler so powerful within his own lands that his orders were obeyed but so dependent on Chinese goodwill, or vulnerable to Chinese threats, that he kept his people from troubling imperial territory. By destroying the Northern Shanyu, the Han removed a potential client and found itself faced with the incoherent but spreading power of the Xianbi, while the Southern regime was overwhelmed by its new responsibilities. So the empire destroyed a weak and all but suppliant enemy for the benefit of a junior ally who could not make good use of the victory, to the ultimate profit of a far more dangerous enemy.

— Rafe de Crespigny

According to the Book of Wei, the remnants of the Northern Chanyu's tribe, whom Lev Gumilyov termed "Weak Xiongnu", settled, as Yueban, near Kucha and Wusun; while the rest fled across the Altai Mountains towards Kangju.
