= Ren Shang =

1st/2nd century Han dynasty general and diplomat

Ren Shang (Chinese: 任尚; Wade–Giles: Jen Shang; fl. 91 - died 118) was the Protector General of the Western Regions under Eastern Han between 102 and 106 CE.

In February 91, he and Geng Kui defeated the unnamed Northern Shanyu shortly after the Battle of the Altai Mountains, on commission by Dou Xian. In 93, he killed the penultimate northern chanyu, Yuchujian Chanyu during a pursuit with Wang Fu. A Chinese inscription stele of him, the Achievements Inscription of Ren Shang of the Han (汉任尚纪功铭) was excavated in 1957 from Kumul, Xinjiang, which recorded the event in 93.

When Ban Chao was retiring from the post of Protector General of the Western Regions in 102 CE due to age an ill health, Ren Shang asked him for some advice. Ban Chao said:

"The officers who are outside the Barrier are naturally not devoted sons and obedient grandsons. All have been deported for some misdeed and ordered to fill a post in the frontier military colonies. On the other hand, the barbarians have the emotions of wild birds and animals. It is difficult to foster their good tendencies and easy to destroy them. Now, you have an austere and strict character. Well, when a river is clear, it doesn’t have big fish. A government that is too meticulous doesn’t obtain the sympathy of its inferiors. You have to be flowing and accommodating, be indulgent with the little mistakes, and content yourself with guiding the hand of the principal generals.
After (Ban) Chao left, (Ren) Shang said in private to his close friends: “I think that Lord Ban has some marvellous prescriptions, but what he said to me was very ordinary."

In 107 CE, the Western Regions in modern Xinjiang province rebelled against Chinese rule. Ban Yong was appointed as a Major (Jun Sima 軍司馬) and, with his elder brother, Ban Xiong (班雄), went to Dunhuang to meet up with the Protector General of the Western Regions, Ren Shang, who had replaced Ban Chao as Protector General in 102 CE. The Chinese had to retreat and, following this, there were no Chinese functionaries in the Western Regions for more than ten years until Ban Yong returned in 126 CE.

According to the Hou Hanshu (Chap. 117, p. 6b), Ren Shang was recalled and executed in 118 CE, for committing exactly the mistakes which Ban Chao had warned him against.
