= Geng Kui =

Late 1st/early 2nd century Han dynasty general

Geng Kui (Chinese: 耿夔; Wade–Giles: Keng K'uei; fl. 91–121), born in Xianyang, Shaanxi, was a Chinese general of the Eastern Han dynasty. He was sent by Dou Xian to defeat the unnamed Northern Chanyu, leader of the Xiongnu. He achieved this in 91 AD, shortly after the Battle of the Altai Mountains. The Northern Chanyu was defeated once more and fled away, abandoning his kingdom. It is unknown where he went or what became of him.

In 109, the Southern Chanyu with a number of Wuhuan and Xianbei rebelled and, by winter, controlled a large area of the northern commanderies near the Yellow River. 20,000 men under He Xi were sent to aid the local Chinese forces. Geng Kui, who is named as being the Governor of Liaodong at the time, and Liang Qin, the last Protector General of the Western Regions who was hurriedly sent with 8,000 men bore the brunt of the fighting. In the 3rd month of 110, the Southern Chanyu was overwhelmed and came to kowtow and begged to surrender. His request was granted.

In the summer of 121, the Xianbei along with the Mo and Hui peoples of the northeast defeated and killed the Grand Administrator Cai Feng. In the autumn they defeated the troops of Yunzhong Commandery and killed Grand Administrator Cheng Yan, and besieged the Colonel Protector of the Wuhuan in the city of Macheng. Geng Kui, who was now entitled the new General Who Crosses the Liao, managed with a large army to drive off, but not defeat the Xianbi and relieve the siege of Macheng. However, the Xianbi, from this time on became more aggressive regularly raiding along the frontier with a force said to number tens of thousands of mounted archers.

Around the time Chanyu Tan died in 124, Geng Kui left office.
