= Qiang (historical people) =

Ethnic group mentioned in ancient Chinese history

羌
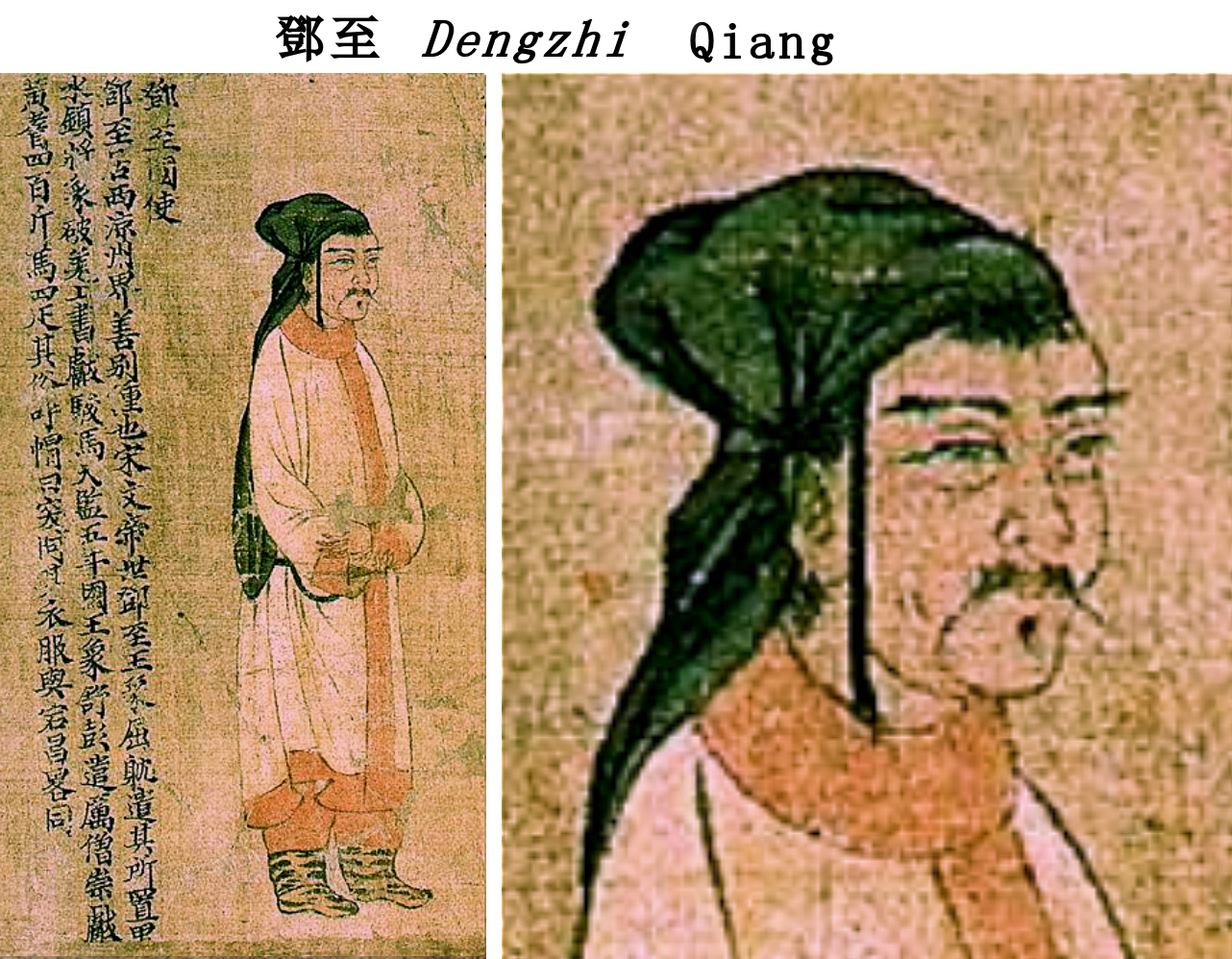
- Depiction of an envoy of Dengzhi, a Qiang ethnic group, from a Portraits of Periodical Offering painting, 6th century CE

Regions with significant populations
- Ancient China

The Qiang (Chinese: 羌; pinyin: Qiāng; Wade–Giles: Ch'iang) were a group of primarily Sino-Tibetan peoples who historically inhabited parts of western China. They are generally believed to have been Tibeto-Burman speakers, though few have also suggested that they were Indo-European.

The Qiang were first mentioned in oracle bone inscriptions dating back to the Shang dynasty (c. 1600–c. 1046 BC). They were not a singular unified ethnicity, but were rather a broad collection of western tribes considered "foreign" by the Chinese. During the Han dynasty (202 BC–220 CE), the Qiang specifically referred to semi-nomadic herdsmen from Gansu and the Tibetan-Qinghai Plateau. Following their expansion into the Hexi Corridor in the 2nd century BCE, the Han came into constant conflict with the various local Qiang tribes such as the Shaodang and Xianlian, who formed loose confederations to resist Chinese rule for centuries.

By the 4th century CE, many of the Qiang had been forcibly resettled within China Proper in eastern Gansu, Ningxia and northern Shaanxi. The Qiang are categorized as one of the "Five Barbarians" of the Sixteen Kingdoms. The Later Qin dynasty (384–417 CE) was founded by the Yao clan of the Shaodang. Meanwhile, the Qiang tribes that remained on the plateau were conquered by the Tuyuhun (284–670 CE) and Tibetan Empire (618–842 CE). During the Tang dynasty (618–907 CE), the Tangut branch of the Qiang offered their submission to the Chinese court, and later founded the Western Xia dynasty (1038–1227 CE).

As many of the western plateau tribes assimilated with the Han Chinese, Tibetans and other surrounding ethnic groups, the scope of the Qiang was gradually reduced to people living in the upper Min River valley in Sichuan. The modern Qiang people, Tibetans and various other Tibeto-Burman ethnic groups in southwestern China may have been descended in part from the ancient Qiang tribes.

== Etymology ==
According to the Han dynasty dictionary Shuowen Jiezi, the Qiang were shepherds, and the Chinese character for Qiang (羌) was thus formed from the characters for "sheep" (羊) and "man" (人), and pronounced like the word for "sheep". Fengsu Tongyi also mentions that the character for Qiang was formed from the words "sheep" and "man". Modern scholars have attempted to reconstruct the ancient pronunciation of Qiang: sinologist Edwin Pulleyblank reconstructs it to *kʰiaŋ in Middle Chinese, while William H. Baxter and Laurent Sagart reconstruct the Old Chinese name of Qiang as *C.qʰaŋ.

Christopher Beckwith proposes that the word "Qiang" may have an Indo-European etymology and that the Qiang were of Indo-European origin; Beckwith compares a proposed reconstruction of Qiang to *klaŋ in Old Chinese to the Tocharian word klānk, meaning "to ride, go by wagon", as in "to ride off to hunt from a chariot", so that Qiang could actually mean "charioteer".

== History ==
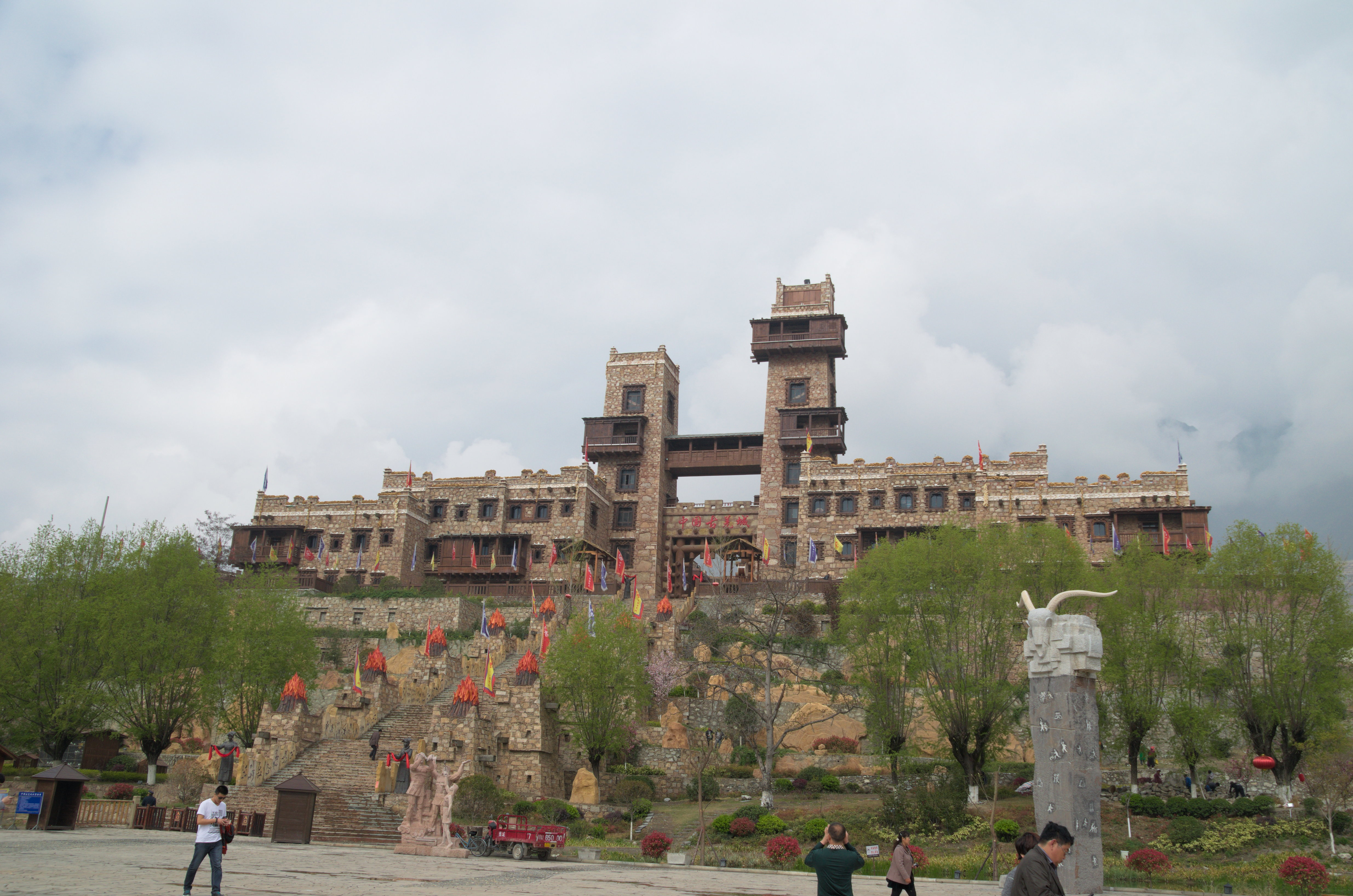
The "City of China's Ancient Qiang" (中国古羌城), a Qiang cultural complex in Mao County, Sichuan

=== Origins and genetics ===
The term "Qiang" did not represent a singular unified ethnic group. Rather, it was an exonym to denote "western others", and was broadly imposed by the Chinese for non-Han shepherding tribes living to the west of the Central Plains. While the label seemingly referred to tribes living in the diagonal band from northern Shaanxi to northern Henan at first, the scope of the Qiang grew over the centuries as the Han expanded westwards, finally reaching the eastern fringes of the Tibetan-Qinghai Plateau.

Modern scholars generally believe that the Qiang tribes were all, if not mostly, progenitors of Tibeto-Burman-speaking peoples. The ancient Di (氐; not to be confused with the Northern Di) were a farming people culturally related to the Qiang, often collectively referred to as the "Di-Qiang". Genetic analyses of Di-Qiang remains at the Mogou site in Lintan County, Gansu found high genetic affinity with modern Sino-Tibetan, particularly modern Qiang people and Han Chinese, as well as with ancient 'Yellow River farmers' associated with the Yangshao culture. The ancient Qiang remains belonged exclusively to paternal haplogroup O-M175 (O3a).

=== Legends and pre-imperial China ===
According to legend, the Qiang originated from the tribe of Fuxi, one of the Three Sovereigns, in the area of modern Tianshui, Gansu and were partly descended from the Yan Emperor, the mythical "Flame Emperor" who was defeated along with his tribe by the Yellow Emperor. The term "Qiang" first appeared on 3,000 years ago on oracle bone inscriptions, which speaks of a "Qiangfang" (羌方) and was used to describe "a people other than one's people." It appears again in the Classic of Poetry in reference to Tang of Shang (trad. 1675–1646 BC). They were enemy of the Shang dynasty, who mounted expeditions against them, capturing slaves and victims for human sacrifice during ancestor veneration rituals. The Qiang prisoners were also skilled in making oracle bones.

Shuowen Jiezi indicated that the Qiangs were shepherds from the west and that they were part of the Western Rong. During the Shang and Zhou dynasties, the Qiang formed a social and economic community comprising many branches, tribes, groups, and cultures that varied in their differences and networks. They had a close relation to the Zhou, and were mentioned in the Book of Documents and Records of the Grand Historian as one of the allies of King Wu of Zhou who defeated the Shang. It has been suggested that the clan of Jiang Yuan, mother of Houji, a figure of Chinese legends and mythology and an ancestor of the Zhou dynasty, was possibly related to the Qiang, or was Qiang itself. Some of the ancient groups were called the Ma Qiang (馬羌; "Horse Qiang") or "Duoma Qiang" (多馬羌; "Many-Horses Qiang"), suggesting they may have been horse breeders.

=== Qin ===
Though the Qiang tribes were never united, an influential figure in their history was Wuyi Yuanjian during the late Warring States Period. According to the Book of Later Han (compiled in the 5th-century CE), he was initially a slave under Duke Ligong of Qin (r. 476-443 BCE) but later escaped and founded a dynasty in the Huangshui River Basin. While likely a legend, Yuanjian was credited with introducing farming and animal husbandry to the Qiang tribes, as well as establishing several common traditions among them, such as his name "Wuyi" becoming the word for "slave" in their languages.

The Qiang tribes had been facing mounting military pressure since the reign of Duke Mu of Qin (r. 659–621 BCE). As a result, the Qiang followed their migratory routes but expanded into larger-scale and distant migrations. By the time of Duke Xian of Qin (r. 384–362 BCE), the descendants of Wuyi Yuanjian also wished to form separate tribes, clans and branches and migrate on their own will. Among their offshoots were the Maoniu (牦牛; "Yak"), Daya (大雅; "Great Elegant"), Baima (白馬; "White Horse"), Canlang (參狼; "Three Wolves" (Note: also known as Wudu Qiang; 武都羌)) and Yan (研; later known as the Shaodang (燒當)) tribes, and the sons of their chieftains continued to form new clans of their own.

Many of the Qiang and Western Rong tribes were brought to submission by Duke Xiao of Qin (r. 361–338 BCE). When Qin Shi Huang began to unify the six states in the second half of the 3rd century BCE, warfare was directed at the feudal lords and former lords still resisting his rule in the east. As the Qin armies stopped marching west, the Qiang branches began to multipy and grow during the time of peace for them. After Qin unified China in 221 BCE, General Meng Tian was dispatched west to seize territory and construct the Great Wall, pushing back the Qiang and Rong.

==== Relations with Ba-Shu ====
Prior to the Qin conquest in 316 BCE, the Sichuan Basin was home to the ancient states of Ba and Shu. The tribes of Shu were known as the "Sou" (叟), and by the Han dynasty era, the term was used interchangeable for anyone from the Shu region. The Sou people were long settled in western Sichuan, specifically in the Chengdu Plain. They lived and intermixed with the Di and Qiang peoples, all while maintaining a degree of autonomy to distinguish themselves as a separate ethnic group. Until the Western Jin dynasty, populations of the Sou inhabited the regions of Shaanxi, Gansu and Sichuan. During the fall of Han, the warlord Lü Bu had Sou people in his army, former Shu soldiers who rebelled.

Like the Shu, the Ba people also contained Di-Qiang ancestry, emerging as a fusion of the southern Pu-Yue (濮越) and the northern Di-Qiang populations. Part of the Ba confederation were the Bo people, who existed as early as the Western Zhou as a branch of the Di-Qiang. The Bo were considered humane and benevolent and thus granted the character "rén" (人; meaning "people"). By the Qin-Han period, the Bo had a higher economic, social and cultural development than other barbarians and thus were considered advanced and civilised. The Bo people's records were sparse before the Qin, but Han records indicated they were sparsely distributed throughout the northwestern river basins, extending southwest in eastern Lancang and north of the Red River in modern Yunnan. By the late Eastern Han, the Bo people had intermixed with the Qiang along the river valleys. Due to the phonetic similarity in their name that can indicate interchangeability, the Bo are also thought to be the ancestors of the modern-day Bai people (白族). Another Di-Qiang branch were known as the Hutang (呼唐), who lived west of the Li river, now known as the Min river in Sichuan. The preexistence of the Qiang people in the southwest allowed many of the central Qiang to migrate from the north of the Qin empire into the southwestern region of China.

=== Western Han ===
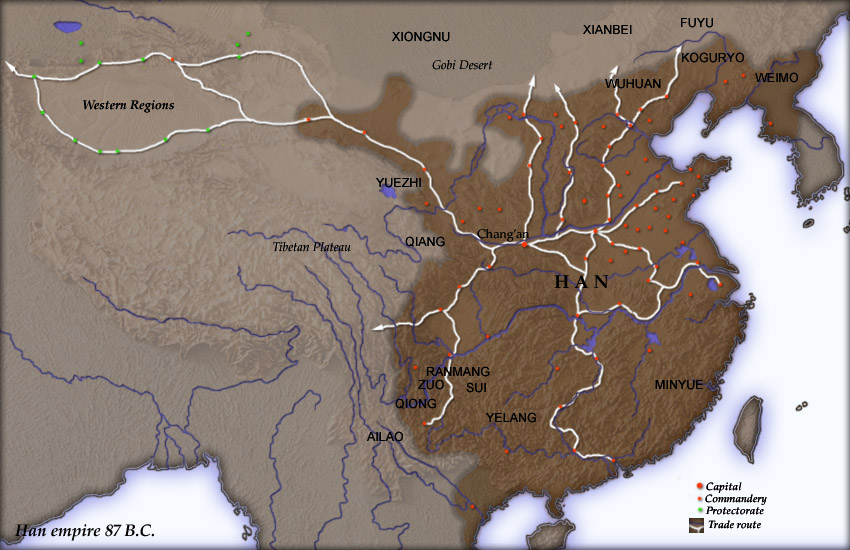
Map of the Han dynasty, c. 87 BCE

The Han dynasty saw a period of extensive Chinese expansion in the west, annexing the lands of modern-day Gansu and northeastern Qinghai, as well as vassalizing the numerous oasis states of the Tarim Basin. The reference of Qiang during this period were primarily semi-nomadic pastoralist tribes originating from the Gansu and Qinghai regions. Throughout the course of the Han dynasty, many Qiang people migrated or were forcibly resettled inland into Chinese territory, where they practiced agriculture as tenent farmers or slaves. This created rough distinction between the Western Qiang (西羌; tribes that remained on or outside the western boundaries in western Gansu and Qinghai) and the Eastern Qiang (東羌; resettled and assimilated tribes within the Chinese interior in eastern Gansu, Shaanxi and Shanxi). Relations between the Qiang tribes and Han were volatile, as the Qiang were frequently driven out of their homelands and suffered oppression at the hands of local Chinese officials and magnates. The various tribes formed loose confederations against the Han, and though they were defeated time and time again, the cost of quelling their rebellions were a significant drain on the Han's economy and military, playing a part in their decline and eventual fall.

Around the same time that the Western Han dynasty began to rule China, the Xiongnu Empire of the northern Eurasian steppe were also rising in power. In the mid-2nd century BCE, the Xiongnu defeated their previous overlords, the Yuezhi in the Hexi Corridor. A branch of them, the Lesser Yuezhi, reportedly migrated into southern Gansu, where they subsequently merged with the Qiang population (some scholars speculate that these people later became known as the Lushuihu). Many of the Qiangs were forced into submission by the Xiongnu, while others moved eastwards to seek protection under the Han. Emperor Jing of Han (r. 157–141 BCE) permitted the submissive Qiang to settle in the counties of Dídao, Angu, Lintao, Dīdao and Qiangdao, where they guarded the frontier.

During the reign of Emperor Wu of Han (r. 141–87 BCE), the Han began a proactive war to neutralize the Xiongnu threat in the north. In 121 BCE, the Han general, Huo Qubing conquered the Hexi Corridor, establishing new frontier commanderies and cutting off the Xiongnu from their Qiang allies. Some of the local and nearby Qiangs were threatened by the Han intrusion into their homelands. In 112 BCE, they formed an alliance, led by the powerful Xianlian tribe (先零), and contacted the Xiongnu to carry out a joint invasion on the Han's western borders. Their invasion was repelled, and subsequently, the Han introduced the Colonel Protector of the Qiang, who was tasked with keeping the Qiangs in check by managing their affairs and suppressing their revolts. As the Xiongnu declined in power in the following centuries, more and more Qiang tribes turned to the Han and moved into their territory.

In 63 BCE, the Xianlian, after their permission to pasture their herds in the Huangshui Valley was rejected by the Han court, swore an oath with the other Qiang tribes to rebel. In 61 BCE, a conspiracy was uncovered between the Xiongnu and a Qiang noble to attack Shanshan and Dunhuang. The court sent an envoy to assess the situation among the tribes, but he instead massacred the Xianlian along with more than thirty of their leaders, causing the Western Qiang to rebel. The Han commander, Zhao Chongguo, famously pacified the rebellion the following year with little bloodshed, largely attributed to his use of tuntian (military-agricultural colonies) and forced resettlement. For the next few decades, the Qiang posed little threat to the western frontier, the only exception being in 42 BCE, when the Shaodang led six other Qiang tribes in rebellion in the Longxi region. The rebels defeated the initial Han forces sent to fight them, but were soon crushed by Feng Fengshi when he returned with 60,000 men the next year.

==== Ruoqiang ====
During the Western Han dynasty, there were a group of nomads to the southwest of Dunhuang known as the Ruo or Ruoqiang (若羌 or 婼羌). Their settlement was considered one of the thirty-six city states of the Protectorate of the Western Regions. They were described in the Book of Han as a people who moved with their livestock in search of water and pasture, made military weapons themselves using iron from the mountains, and possessed bows, lances, short knives, swords and armour.

=== Eastern Han ===
After the fall of the Xin dynasty in 23 CE, the Qiangs took advantage of the Chinese civil war to reassert their dominance over the Xining Valley and Longxi region. The local warlord, Wei Ao, having little success in his battles against the Qiang, decided to enter a loose alliance with the Xianlian and other Qiang tribes, employing their people as auxiliaries in his army. After Wei Ao's death, his son surrendered his territory over to Emperor Guangwu of Han. The emperor sent Lai Xi and later Ma Yuan to subjugate the Qiang in Wei Ao's former domain. In 35 CE, Ma Yuan's campaign drove the rebellious Qiangs out of the border and broke the power of the Xianlian. To relieve pressure on the western frontier, Ma Yuan had Qiang prisoners forcibly resettled away from the frontier to the upper valley of the Wei river within the Guanzhong basin.

The decline of the Xianlian allowed the Shaodang to take their place and seize their territory in 40 CE. In 57 CE, the Shaodang chieftain, Dianyu invaded Jincheng Commandery and incited the other Qiang tribes to rebel. After a string of victories, Dianyu was eventually defeated by Han forces and surrendered in 59 CE. He and his people were forcibly relocated to the commanderies surrounding Chang'an. Dianyu was content with life as a Han subject, but his son, Miyu, was unruly and frequently engaged in plunder. In 76 CE, a short-lived Qiang uprising broke out stemming from an incident where a Chinese county official abducted a Qiang woman from one of the tribes. The following year, when Miyu attempted to leave the frontier with his followers and defeated the Han army in his pursuit, the various Qiang tribes rose up in support of him along with the Lushuihu people. The initial uprising was quelled, but the rebels continued to operate to a minor degree before Miyu's forces routed another army in 86 CE. The next year, Miyu was defeated and asked to surrender. He and his followers were invited to a banquet, where the Colonel Protector had them massacred. This betrayal only encouraged Miyu's son, Mitang to carry on with the rebellion. Mitang launched major raids on the Han frontier in 87, 92, and 97 CE before suffering his final defeat in 101 CE.

In 107 CE, the Han court abolished and abandoned the Protectorate of the Western Regions. The Eastern Qiang were conscripted to aid in the withdrawal, but a mutiny broke out within their ranks when rumours spread that they were being exiled instead. The Han generals indiscriminately persecuted their non-Han auxiliaries to restore order, but news of this reached back to the Qiangs' homelands, creating further fear and anxiety. Soon, the Qiang were once again in rebellion. They elected a Xianlian chieftain, Dianlian as their leader and were prominently backed by the Zhong tribe (鍾). The rebels attacked Liang province, and the Han court sent Deng Zhi and Ren Shang against them. Although the Qiang forces suffered significant casualties, the Han army were defeated at Hanyang Commandery, after which Dianlian proclaimed himself emperor. In 109 CE, he conquered Longxi, and the following year, he killed the Administrator of Hanzhong. At the peak of the rebellion, the Qiangs were able to raid Han territory as far south as Hanzhong and as far east as Ji province. However, after Dianlian died in 112 CE, he was succeeded by his son, Lianchang, who was too young to exercise authority. Another man of the tribe, Langmo, took charge of strategy, but the new regime was significantly less effective under the regent and failed to make any headway against Han forces. In 116 CE, the Han general Deng Zun led 10,000 Southern Xiongnu cavalry in a raid on Lianchang's headquarters from the north while Ren Shang attacked from the south. Lianchang was assassinated the next year, and forces under Ren Shang ended the Qiang raids.

After Lianchang's defeat, the Han were able to gain a few years to recover and reconstruct the northwestern region from devastation. Qiang revolts and raids persisted during this period, such as the cases of the Shaodang in 121 and 137 CE and the Zhong in 126 and 134 CE, but were not as serious and were forcibly put down by the general, Ma Xian. However, by 140 CE, another major Qiang uprising had gripped the region, coinciding with the Southern Xiongnu and Wuhuan rebellions on the northern frontier. Ma Xian was killed in battle against Qiang, inspiring more of their tribes to join and placing the key city of Chang'an under threat. The uprising was defeated in 44 CE, but costed the Han government around eight thousand million in cash and put an end to their reconstruction effort.

The next fifteen years were relatively peaceful in the northwest, but by 159 CE, a new Qiang disturbance was on the horizon. This time, the Han court employed a certain Duan Jiong to restore the peace on the frontier. His initial military campaigns against the Qiang, while victorious, did not stop them from raiding altogether, and in 161 CE, he was removed from office. The court then entrusted Huangfu Gui with averting a full-scale crisis. Huangfu employed an effective strategy of appeasement by purging many of the local corrupt officials and bribing the Qiangs into surrender, but the court disapproved of his method and subsequently dismissed him as well. Duan Jiong was reinstated in 163 CE, and he continued to deal with the Qiang through military might. In 167 CE, the Xianlian rebelled and invaded the Chang'an region, but were soon defeated. Despite their surrender, Duan Jiong convinced the court that it would not be long before the Xianlian would stir up trouble among the Qiang again, and that the only way to prevent this was to launch a preemptive strike. That same year, Duan Jiong embarked on a brutal two-year-long campaign against the Xianlian. According to the Book of Han, he fought 180 engagements with the Qiang, massacring around 38,000 people from military leaders to children.

Duan Jiong's campaigns brought another temporary peace, but ultimately did not solve the Qiang issue. Fifteen years later, the Liang Province rebellion would finally see the Han lose control over the northwest. In 184 CE, remnants of the Xianlian and their allied tribes initially led a minor revolt, but when they were supported by Qiang and Lesser Yuezhi mutineers from the Auxiliary of Loyal Barbarians of Huangzhong, the uprising quickly spread throughout the region and was even joined by the local Han Chinese population. The rebels captured Jincheng and reached Youfufeng Commandery in 185 CE, and from there carried out raids against Chang'an. A Han army was sent out against them led by Huangfu Song and Zhang Wen but they failed to achieve any major victory. That same year, the general Dong Zhuo won a battle against the rebels and forced them to withdraw. The rebellion continued on for years until 189 CE, when the Han government fell into disarray after Dong Zhuo seized the capital at Luoyang and fragmented the rest of the empire.

Despite their roles as initiators, the Qiang tribes seemingly withdrew from the conflict as it carried on and kept to themselves, leaving the northwestern region to be carved up by their Chinese allies. One of the prominent warlords that emerged during this time was Ma Teng, a descendant of Ma Yuan and the son of a Chinese father and a Qiang mother who lived among the tribes. When the Han Chancellor, Cao Cao launched his campaign to reclaim the northwest in 211 CE, the Qiang rallied behind Ma Teng's son, Ma Chao and other warlords such as Han Sui and Zhang Lu to oppose the invasion, but were eventually defeated and forced back under Han rule.

=== Three Kingdoms ===
The Han dynasty came to an end in 220 CE as China entered the Three Kingdoms period (220–280 CE). For the next 43 years, the northwest became a heavily contested region between the rival states of Cao Wei in northern China and Shu Han in the Sichuan Basin. The local Qiang tribes were compelled to side with either one of the states, serving as military auxiliaries and providing supplies to the frontlines. A core strategy of the Shu Han during their northern expeditions was to win over the support of the Qiang and other non-Han tribes. When the Qiangs in Wei territory revolted in 247–248 CE, the Shu commander, Jiang Wei led two expeditions to aid them, but found no success.

=== Jin dynasty (266–420 CE) and Sixteen Kingdoms ===
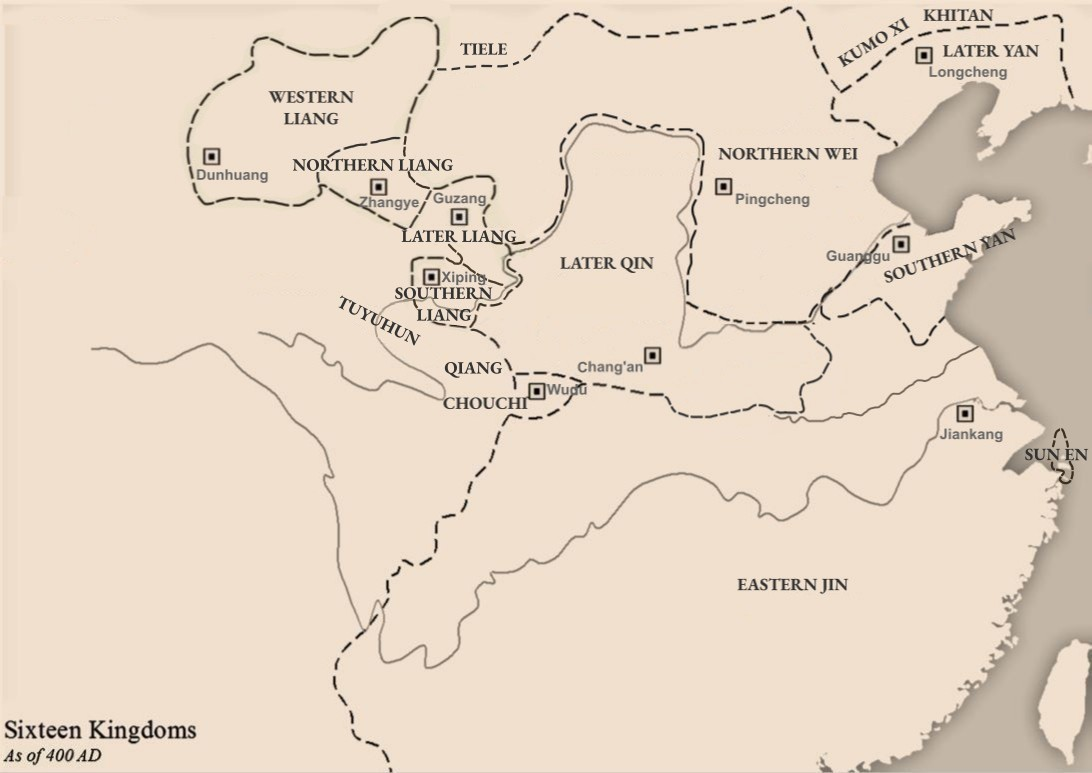
The Later Qin dynasty, c. 400 CE.

The Qiang population in the northwest continued to grow as tribes from other ethnic groups such as the Di and Xianbei were also forcibly resettled into the region and began living alongside them. After the fall of Shu Han and the establishment of the Jin dynasty (266–420 CE), the Qiang partook in the uprisings of the Xianbei, Tufa Shujineng (270–280 CE) and the Di, Qi Wannian (296–299 CE), both of which matched the severity and devastation of the Qiang rebellions from the Han days. In a memorial submitted to the court in 300 CE, the official, Jiang Tong claimed that roughly half of the population in the Guanzhong Basin were Qiang or other tribal ethnicities. To prevent further upheaval, he proposed that the Qiang tribes of northern Guanzhong should be deported outside of the frontier, but the court did not heed his suggestion.

The Qiang are commonly known in historiography as one of the "Five Barbarians" (along with the Xiongnu, Jie, Xianbei and Di) who drove the Jin out of northern China and founded many of the Sixteen Kingdoms in the 4th and early 5th centuries. During the Disaster of Yongjia (307–313 CE), the Shaodang chieftain, Yao Yizhong led tens of thousands of Chinese and non-Chinese to seek refuge in the Fufeng region. After submitting to the Jie-led Later Zhao dynasty, he and his followers were relocated east to Hebei, where he held the important office of Grand Commander of the Western Qiang. Following the destruction of Zhao and Yizhong's death in 352 CE, his son, Yao Xiang led his followers south and joined the Jin, but soon mutinied and attempted to return to his ancestral home in northwestern China. Along the way, he was killed in battle by forces of the Di-led Former Qin, but his brother, Yao Chang was spared and allowed to serve as a general. After the disastrous Former Qin defeat at the Battle of Fei River, Yao Chang was enticed into rebelling, and in 384 CE, he founded the Later Qin dynasty, the one and only Qiang state among the Sixteen Kingdoms.

The Later Qin established their capital at Chang'an in 386 CE. In 394 CE, Yao Chang's son and successor, Yao Xing crushed the last vestige of the Former Qin's power, establishing his state as a major power in the Guanzhong Basin. Under his rule, the Later Qin reached their zenith by conquering the Henan region from the Jin and vassalizing many of their contemporary states. Although a Qiang, Yao Xing was highly sinicized and promoted Confucianism in the region by building schools that attracted thousands of students to Chang'an. One account states that an envoy from the Tuoba-Xianbei Northern Wei became so immersed in Chinese literary culture during his detainment at Chang'an that he was executed for his emulation of "Qiang manners" upon his return to Wei. At the same time, Yao Xing was also a devoted Buddhist. He was notably a patron of the Kuchean monk, Kumārajīva in his translation of Sanskrit Buddhist texts to Chinese, and during his rule, it was reported that nine-tenths of the population in his domain embraced Buddhism. After the death of Yao Xing in 416 CE, the Later Qin suffered from internal power struggles, and just a year later, they were conquered by the Jin.

=== Northern and Southern dynasties ===
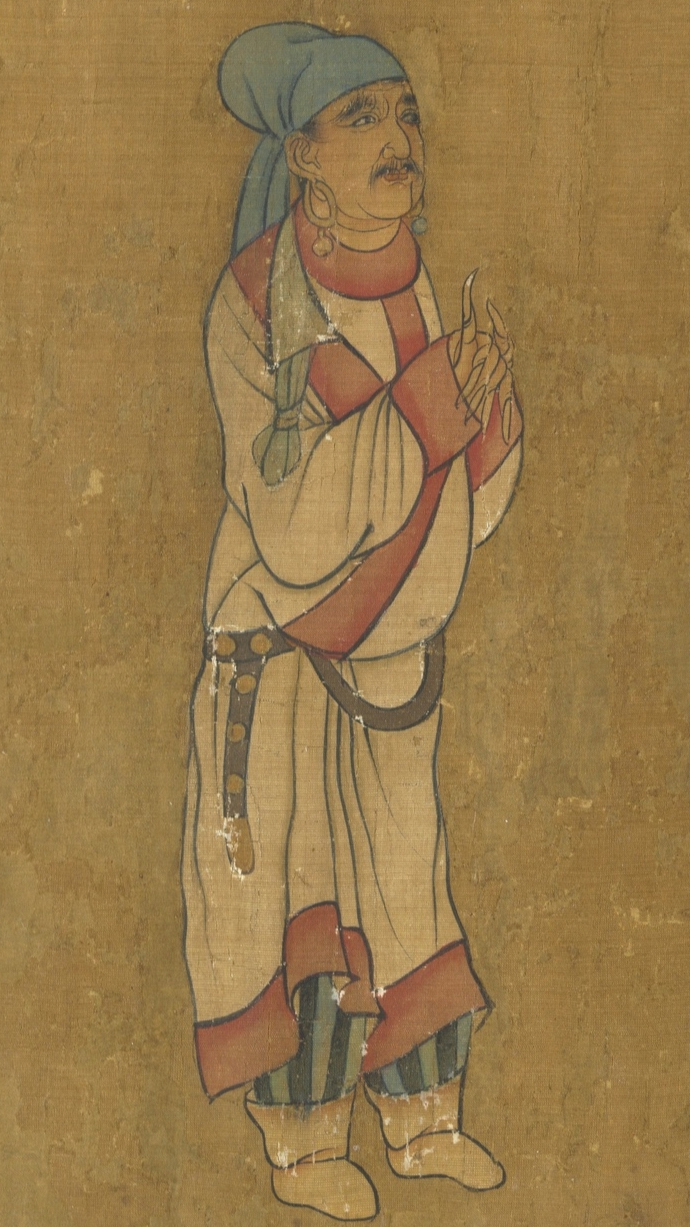
Depiction of an envoy of the Dangchang Kingdom from The Gathering of Kings, c. 650 CE

In 313 CE, a branch of the Murong-Xianbei people arrived from the Yin Mountains to Qinghai. These people adopted the name Tuyuhun, and for the next few centuries, they expanded their influence across the region, subjugating and ruling over many of the native Qiang tribes. As the Tuyuhun rose to power, the Qiangs also formed two minor polities at the eastern edges of the plateau. The Dengzhi in present-day Jiuzhaigou County, Sichuan was founded by the Baishui tribe (白水), whose rulers had the family name of Xiang (像/象), while the Dangchang Kingdom in modern Tanchang County, Gansu was led by the Liang clan (梁), who were likely a branch of the Canlang tribe. During the Northern and Southern dynasties period of China, the Dangchang and Dengzhi regularly sent tribute to both the northern and southern imperial courts as they faced mounting pressure from the Tuyuhun. By the late 6th century, both polities were annexed by the Northern Zhou dynasty and turned into administrative provinces.

Not long after the fall of the Later Qin, the Qiangs in China Proper became subjects of the Northern Wei (386–535 CE), led by the Tuoba clan of Xianbei ethnicity who reunified northern China in 439 CE. The Tuoba evidently had the Qiang and other non-Xianbei peoples conscripted into their armies as auxiliaries, with Emperor Taiwu of Northern Wei once boasting that these troops were expendable during a campaign against the Liu Song dynasty in 450 CE. A notable Qiang figure from this period was Wang Yu, a Buddhist palace eunuch and architect during the regency of Empress Dowager Feng. The term "Qiang" also became a general label for people from the Guanzhong or northwestern region, seen in the case of the Han scholar Xu Zunming who hailed from the Shaanxi region. The Qiang continued participating in large-scale uprisings in the northwest against the Northern Wei, such as the rebellion of the Lushuihu, Gai Wu, in 445 CE, and later during the Rebellion of the Six Garrisons in 523–530 CE.

After years of civil war, the Northern Wei was split into two competing courts in the east and west in 534 CE. The Western Wei (535–557 CE), led by the Yuwen clan of Xianbei ethnicity, held control over the Guanzhong Basin, and was later superseded by the Northern Zhou (557–581 CE). Previously, the Northern Wei had maintained a Xianbei-dominated military class to consolidate their rule. However, faced with their rival Eastern Wei and their larger population base, the new western regime was forced to intergrate the predominantly Han and Qiang population of the northwest into their ranks. The result was a new hybridized northwestern aristocracy of Xianbei, Han, and Qiang descent that gave birth to the Sui (581–618 CE) and Tang (618–907 CE) dynasties.

=== Tibetan Empire ===
The Qiang tribes that expanded eastward joined the Han people in the course of historical development, while the other branches that traveled southwards crossed over the Hengduan Mountains and entered the Yungui Plateau. Others went even farther to Burma, forming numerous ethnic groups of the Tibetan-Burmese language family. Even today, from linguistic similarities, their relative relationship can be seen. Some Qiang tribes such as the Fa (發) and Tangmao (唐旄) settled near the Lancang River of upper Tibet and intermingled with the local population. The 11th-century Chinese text, the New Book of Tang, claims that the Chinese word for "Fa" was phonetically similar to the word "Bod" (蕃) in the Fa tribe's language, and hence their descendants referred to themselves as the Tubo people (吐蕃), better known as the Tibetans. While the ethnic origin of the Tibetans is likely more complex than what traditional sources have suggested, modern anthropologist Fei Xiaotong remarked: "Even if the Qiang people might not be regarded as the main source of the Tibetan people, it is undoubtedly that the Qiang people played a certain role in the formation of Tibetan race".

The Tibetan Empire emerged as a major regional power under the Yarlung dynasty in the early 7th century, around the same time as the Tang dynasty began their rule over China. The empire rapidly expanded their borders across the Tibetan-Qinghai plateau, conquering the Tuyuhun in 670 CE and forcing the various Qiang tribes of the plateau such as the Bailan (白蘭) into submission. With the rise of the Tibetans, the "Qiang" ethnic label became increasingly narrow, as the tribes either assimilated into the Han Chinese, Tibetans or the various communities in southwestern China whose people are classified today as the Yi people.

=== Tangut and Western Xia ===
Tangut officials

The Dangxiang Qiang (党項), better known as the Tangut people, were considered a nomadic branch originating from southeastern Qinghai and northwestern Sichuan. During the Sui and early Tang, the Tanguts were steadily driven out by the Tuyuhun and then the Tibetan Empire into the areas of modern Gansu, Ningxia and northern Shaanxi, where they became subjects of the Chinese imperial courts. The migrating Tanguts were consisted of eight tribes, the most powerful being the Tuoba clan, whose name suggests that they had intermingled with the Xianbei. In 881 CE, amidst the turmoil of the Huang Chao Rebellion, a Tangut leader, Tuoba Sigong led his forces to aid the Tang government in quelling the rebellion. For his contribution, Tuoba Sigong was granted hereditary control over the Dingnan Jiedushi.

The Dingnan Jiedushi was effectively an independent regime, only making nominally submissions to the Tang and the successive Five Dynasties (907–960 CE). As the Song dynasty (960–1279 CE) threatened to strip their autonomy away, the ruling Tanguts resisted their attempts and expanded westward to the Hexi Corridor. Eventually, they formally broke away from the Song by founding the Western Xia dynasty (1038–1227 CE), with their capital at Xingqing in modern-day Yinchuan, Ningxia. The first ruler of Xia, Emperor Jingzong, adopted the Tangut family name of "Weiming" (Chinese: 嵬名) and introduced a new national script for the Tangut language. The Western Xia also sponsored Buddhism as their state religion, as evident by their translation of Buddhist works and the unique architecture of their imperial mausoleums. The population of the Xia were not only Tangut, but also Han Chinese, Uyghur and Tibetan. Confucianism received backing from the state on an administrative level, with schools and temples built throughout the land.

The Western Xia constantly shifted between war and paying tribute to the rival Song, Khitan Liao (916–1125 CE) and Jurchen Jin (1115–1234 CE). In the early 13th century, the Tanguts offered their submission to the Mongol Empire, but renounced their vassalage not long after. In 1225 CE, Mongol forces under Genghis Khan invaded the Western Xia in retaliation. The Mongols quickly overran the empire, and in 1227 CE, the last emperor of Xia surrendered and was promptly executed. The Mongols proceeded to sack and massacre his capital, destroying most of the Tanguts' architecture and written records. Despite the brutality of the Mongols, there were still remnants of the Tanguts that survived long after the conquest. Some joined the Mongols and later found themselves resettled in eastern parts of China. Others escaped south to Tibet, Yunnan or Sichuan, where surviving members of the Xia imperial family even managed to establish a small regime in modern-day Kangding, Sichuan that lasted until the reign of the Kangxi Emperor of the Qing dynasty.

=== Decline and descendants ===
Since the emergence of the Tibetans in the 7th century, the Chinese used the terms "Qiang" and the Tibetan autonym of "Bod" interchangeably to refer to the people of the western plateaus, even after the collapse of the Tibetan Empire in 842 CE. The Qiang were rarely mentioned during the Yuan dynasty (1271–1368 CE). The ruling Mongols were more familiar with the Tibetans in their language and used the term "Western Bod" (西蕃) instead, which was later picked up and applied by the Ming dynasty (1368–1644 CE). The interchangeability of the two labels continued for some time, but by the Qing dynasty (1644–1912 CE), the usage of Qiang had shrunk to only refer to those living upstream of the Min River in Sichuan.

The people of the upper Min River valley commonly identify themselves as Rma and were influenced by the Han and Tibetans, but did not appear to have a coherent culture among their communities as late as the early 20th century. In the late 1950s, as part of the Chinese government's ethnic recognition project, the self-identifying Rma people were officially assigned the ethnic label of "Qiangzu" (羌族), leading to the creation of the modern Qiang people. Today, the descendants of the ancient Qiang peoples are widely distributed among the Han Chinese, Tibetans, modern Qiang, Yi, Nakhi, Bai, Lisu, Pumi and many other ethnic groups in southwestern China.

== Language ==
A problematic case is the “Qiang,” which as Wang Mingke has established, is an old Chinese term along the western borderlands for people in the middle, neither Chinese nor Tibetan, neither exclusively agricultural nor purely pastoral, and likely referring to a variety of successive frontier populations. Communities and individuals were not firmly identified with the modern nationality Qiang, by others as well as themselves, until the People’s Republic. Today, they are concentrated in Maozhou and Wenchuan and parts of Lixian and Heishui, plus a few in the southernmost part of Songpan. They speak a variety of non-Tibetan dialects in two main forms, Northern and Southern Qiang, but some speak only Chinese.

— Xiaofei Kang

The Qiang did not have surnames until the last few hundred years when they adopted Han Chinese surnames. Later in the Han dynasty, groups of people in the western part of Sichuan were mentioned in the Book of the Later Han as separate branches of the Qiang. A song from one of these groups, the "White Wolf" people, was transcribed in Chinese characters together with Chinese translation, and the language has since been identified as a Tibeto-Burman language. The Tangut language is also a branch of Tibeto-Burman, now argued to be part of the Horpa subgroup of West Gyalrongic.

== Culture ==
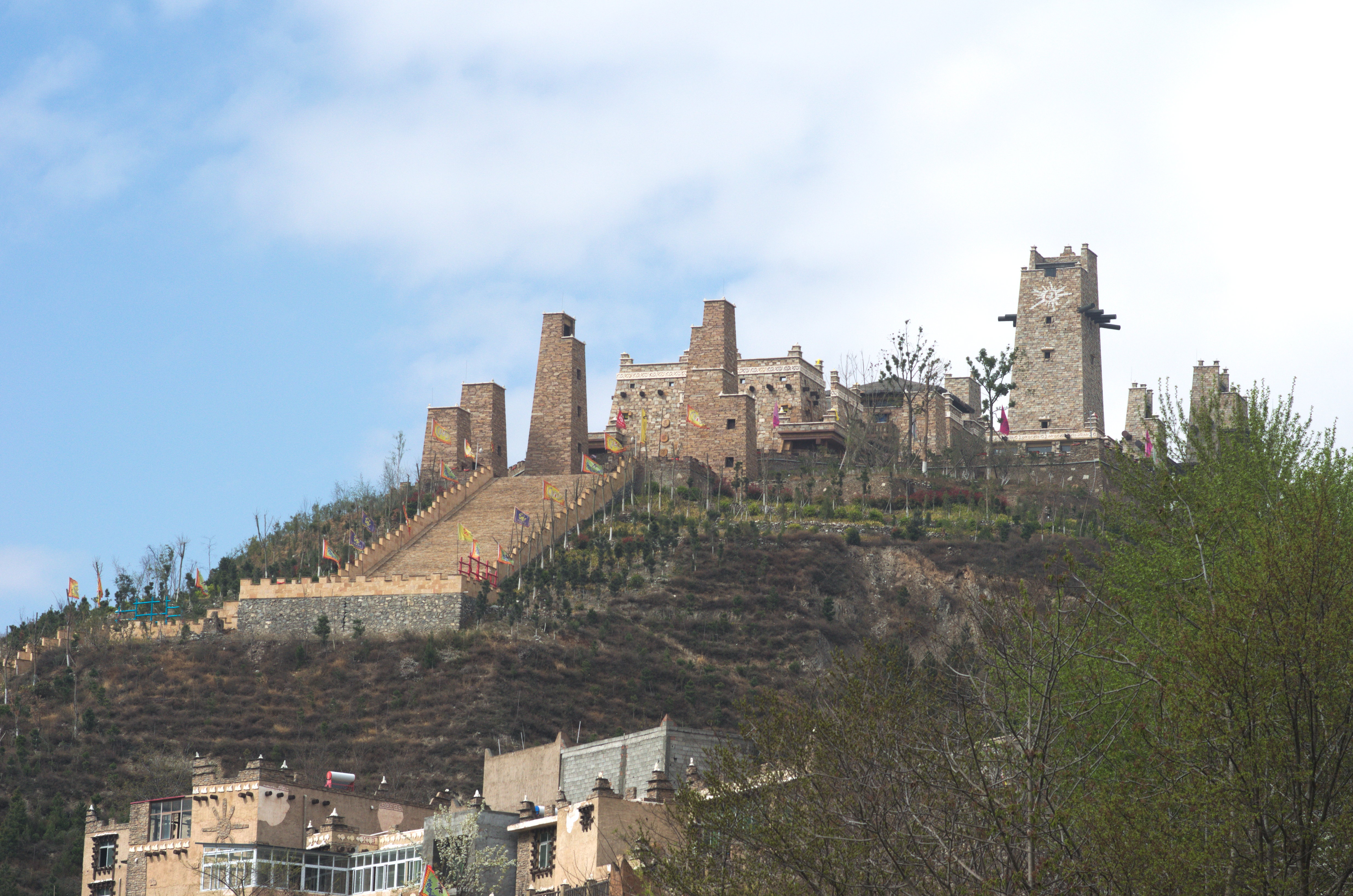
The Silver Turtle Temple is a complex of Qiang temples dedicated to various gods consecrated in 2013–2014. Its three temples are dedicated to Yandi, Dayu and Li Yuanhao, the most important deities of the Qiang people. It is located on Qiangshan, in Qiang City, Mao County of Ngawa Tibetan and Qiang Autonomous Prefecture, in Sichuan.

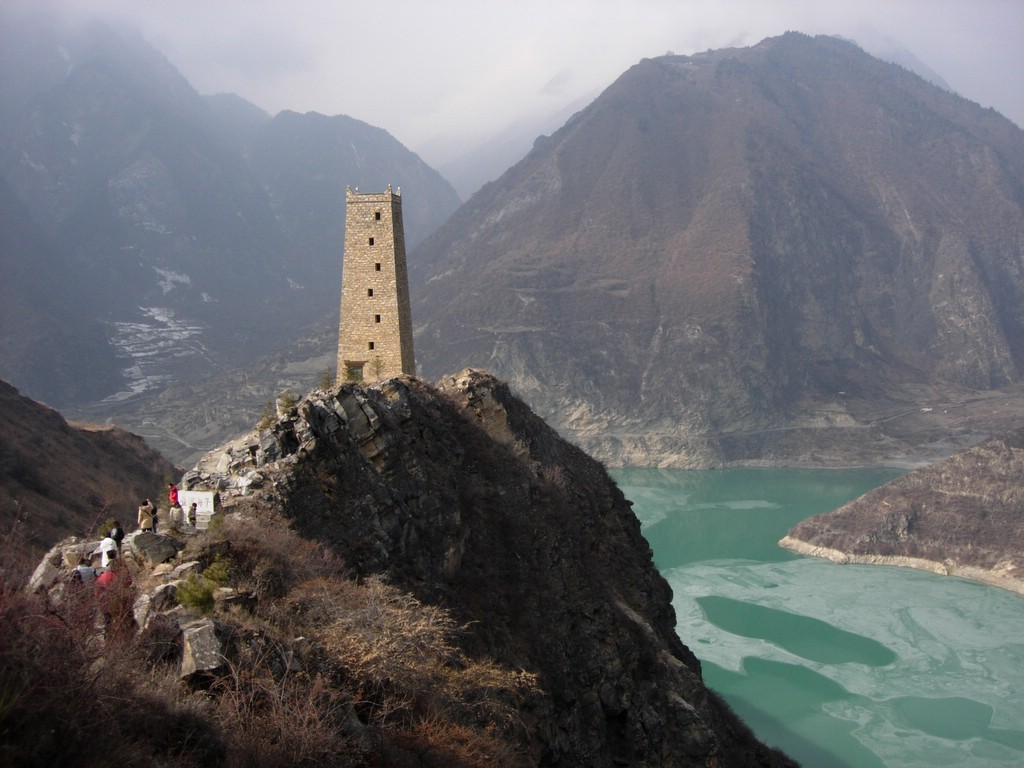
Qiang guard tower

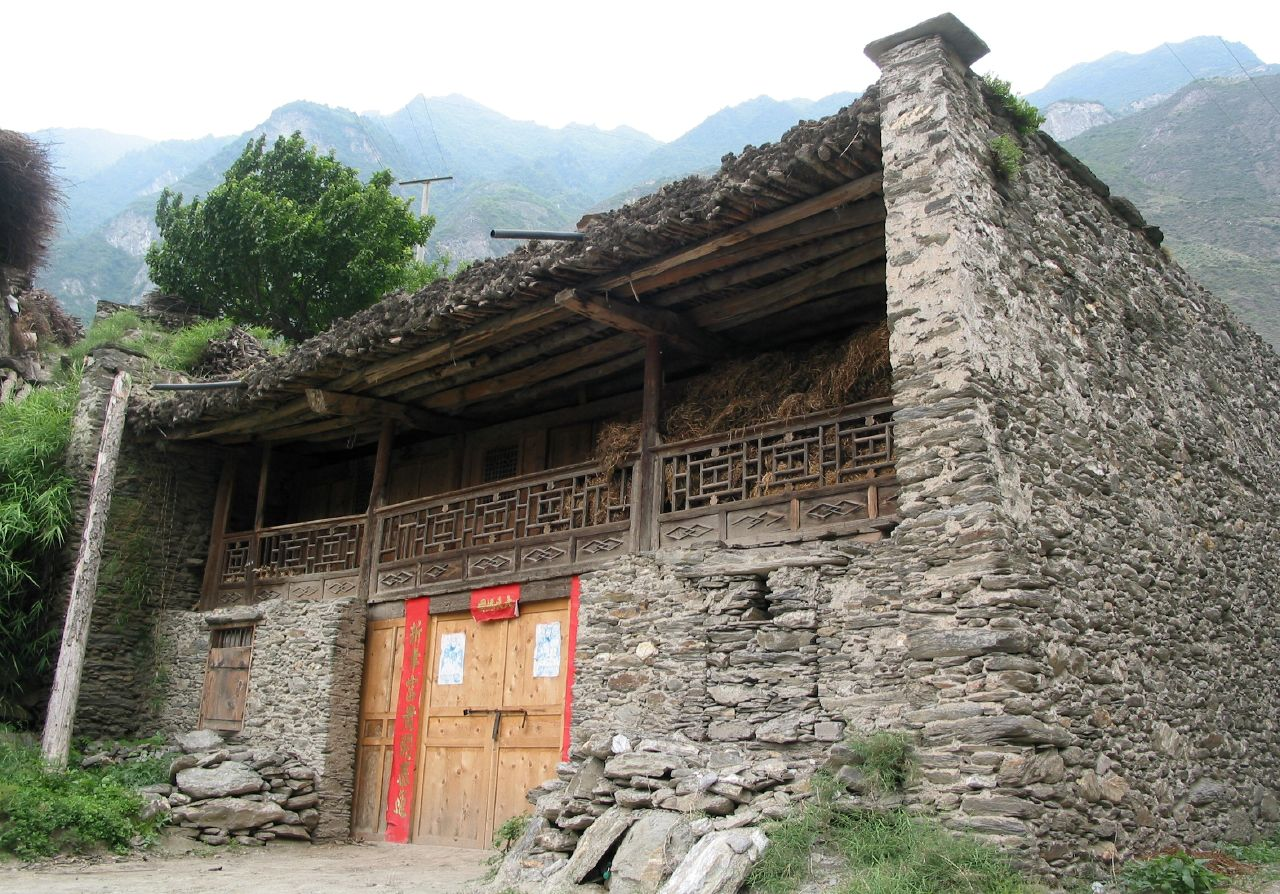
Traditional Qiang house

The Qiang were first described as nomadic shepherds living in the region of contemporary Gansu and Qinghai provinces. Unlike other nomads, the Qiang did not shave their heads and wore their hair loose over their face. At some point prior to the modern era they settled and adopted an agricultural way of life. Due to constant conflict between Qiang tribes and other peoples, the Qiang built numerous stone guard towers with small windows and doors, giving them the moniker of the "Stone Tower Culture". These constructs, described as Himalayan Towers, can be found today in eastern Tibet and Sichuan Province.

The 5th century Liu Song dynasty historian, Fan Ye (398–445) wrote a history of the Western Qiang describing traits such as "disheveled hair", folding their coat from the left side, and marriage customs where a widow would either marry her son or the deceased husband's brother. According to Fan, the Qiang lived in tribes and had no unified ruler.

According to the 11th century Northern Song dynasty polymath Shen Kuo, the Qiang people of Qingtang (also known as the Tibetan kingdom of Tsongkha) were noted for producing high quality steel armour.

The Qiang people of Qingtang are skilled at forging armour. The colour of the iron is blue-black, so clear and bright that it can mirror a hair. They use musk-deer leather for the thongs to string it together - it is soft, thin, and tough.

— Shen Kuo

Qiang society followed matrilineal descent and it was men who integrated into the women's lineage upon their deaths. Others consider Qiang society to be patrilineal but with high status for women. Marriage was monogamous and forbidden within the same family for three generations. A large entourage fetched the bride and delivered her to the groom's house where the wedding ceremony was held, which involved dancing and drinking highland barley wine. After three days, the bride returned to her parents' house and lived there for a year until the birth of the first child. The men traveled to their wives' residences and worked their land for a long period of time as bride service. Despite the centrality of women in Qiang families, Qiang society was neither matriarchal nor egalitarian. Men held all the important political and religious positions, although there is some evidence that female shamans existed at one point. As in most agricultural societies, women were responsible for domestic and agricultural work while men engaged in construction, transport, and plowing.

In the Qiang culture, ram's horn flower represents true love. Young men use the flower to express their love for their beloved.

== Religion ==
The Qiang revered the tiger and featured it prominently on their totem poles. White stones (flint stones) were also considered to be sacred and sometimes put on altars or rooftops. Qiang folk religion resembles animism and shamanism. It places spiritual belief in the natural features of the landscape and the ability of shamans to contact spirits. The Qiang believed in the door god, the fireplace god, and the house god. The fireplace god was sacrificed to with food near an iron potholder before each meal. An altar in the corner of the main floor facing the door was considered sacred. It showed the financial status of the household with how ornate it was.

The Qiang celebrated the Qiang New Year on the 24th day of the sixth month of the lunar calendar. Now it is fixed on 1 October. The Mountain Sacrifice Festival is held between second and sixth months of the lunar calendar.

Religious ceremonies were performed by shamans known as duangong or xbi in Qiang. Xbi were responsible for initiation ceremonies for young men who reached 18 years of age. The ceremony, known as "sitting on top of the mountain" in Qiang, involves a family ritual sacrificing a sheep or cow and planting three cypress trees on top of a mountain. These shamans were also responsible for passing down Qiang stories as there was no written Qiang language until recently.

== Relation to modern Qiang ==
In most current scholarship, especially in Chinese, the modern Qiangzu are assumed to be the same as Ancient Qiangzu. However, compared to other Tibeto-Burman speakers, Qiangzu does not have a closer relation to the Ancient Qiang group. Nevertheless they have been designated as Qiangzu by the Chinese government. The arbitrary assignment of Qiang (羌) to a specific ethnic group has created confusion. First, in general, people could hardly avoid making an artificial equivalence between Ancient Qiang and Qiangzu. Since Qiangzu was named in 1950, other Tibeto-Burman speakers or Ancient Qiang descendants show no interest in dating their history back to Ancient Qiang, asking, “How could we (Yi 9,000,000; Tibetan 6,000,000) be descendants of the small Qiangzu?” Moreover, since the assignment of the name Qiangzu, the indigenous culture (Rme/ʐme/ culture) has been strongly shaped by the willing and concomitant necessity of creating a Qiang culture that demonstrates unmerited links to Ancient Qiang. Thirdly, the term Qiang split the Rme people (those using the Rme/ʐme autonym) into two parts. The Rme in Heishui are not considered Qiangzu but Tibetan by the Central Government.

— Maotao Wen

== Pre-Tangut tribes ==
- Baima (白馬)
- Baishui (白水; also known as Dengzhi (鄧至))
- Beinan (卑湳)
- Canlang (參狼)
- Chendi (沈氐)
- Congzi (葱茈)
- Dangchang (宕昌)
- Dangjian (當煎)
- Dangtian (當闐)
- Daya (大雅)
- Fa (發)
- Fengyang (封養)
- Funan (傅難)
- Gongtang (鞏唐)
- Goujiu (句就)
- Han (罕)
- Huangniu (黄牛)
- Hunu (狐奴)
- Judong (且凍)
- Lao (牢)
- Laojie (牢姐)
- Lejie (勒姐)
- Lianyu (零吾)
- Linan (離湳)
- Maoniu (牦牛)
- Niaowu (鳥吾)
- Qian (幵)
- Qianren (虔人)
- Ruo (若 or 婼)
- Shanjie (彡姐)
- Shaodang (燒當; also known as Yan (研))
- Shaohe (燒何)
- Shicheng (石城)
- Tangmao (唐旄)
- Wuliang (吾良)
- Xianlian (先零)
- Zhong (鍾)

== See also ==
- Qiang people
- Baima people
- Tangut people
- Gyalrong people
- Tibetan people
- Achang people
- Bamar people
- Sumpa
- Mosuo
- Nakhi people
- Pumi people
- Yi people
- Hua–Yi distinction
- Ethnic groups in Chinese history

== Sources ==
- Cosmo, Nicola Di (2002), Ancient China and Its Enemies, Cambridge University Press
- Cosmo, Nicola di (2009), Military Culture in Imperial China, Harvard University Press
- Crespigny, Rafe de (1984), Northern Frontier: The Policies and Strategy of the Later Han Empire, The Australian National University, Faculty of Asian Studies
- Crespigny, Rafe de (2007), A Biographical Dictionary of Later Han to the Three Kingdoms, Brill
- Crespigny, Rafe de (2010), Imperial Warlord, Brill
- Crespigny, Rafe de (2017), Fire Over Luoyang: A History of the Later Han Dynasty, 23-220 AD, Brill
- LaPolla, Randy (2003), A Grammar of Qiang, Mouton Gruyter
- Kang, Xiaofei (2016), Contesting the Yellow Dragon
- Twitchett, Denis (1994), "The Liao", The Cambridge History of China, Volume 6, Alien Regime and Border States, 907-1368, Cambridge: Cambridge University Press, pp. 43–153, ISBN 0521243319
- Twitchett, Denis (2008), The Cambridge History of China: Volume 1, Cambridge University Press
- Wen, Maotao (2014). The Creation of the Qiang Ethnicity, its Relation to the Rme People and the Preservation of Rme Language (Master thesis). Duke University.
- Wagner, Donald B. (2008), Science and Civilization in China Volume 5-11: Ferrous Metallurgy, Cambridge University Press
- West, Barbara A. (2009), Encyclopedia of Peoples of Asia and Oceania, Facts on File
- Whiting, Marvin C. (2002), Imperial Chinese Military History, Writers Club Press
- Wan, Yonglin (2011). 中国古代藏缅语民族源流研究 [A Study on the Ethnic Origins of the Tibeto-Burman Language in Ancient China] (in Chinese). Yunnan: 云南大学出版社 [Yunnan University Press]. ISBN 9787548204503.
