= Dou Xian =

1st-century Chinese general

- Born: Xianyang, Han
- Died: 92 AD
- Military career
- Allegiance: Han
- Conflicts: Battle of the Altai Mountains

Dou Xian (Chinese: 竇憲; Wade–Giles: Tou Hsien; fl. 70 AD - died c.August 92 AD) was a Chinese general and consort kin of the Eastern Han dynasty, famous for destroying the Xiongnu nomadic empire.

== Early life ==
A native of modern-day Xianyang, Shaanxi Province, he was part of the powerful Dou clan which dominated court politics during his tenure. However, his father Dou Xun fell into disgrace and died in 70 AD, leaving Dou Xian an orphan. His fortunes were greatly enhanced, though, when his two sisters entered the imperial harem in 77. In the following year, the older of these two sisters became Empress Zhangde, the wife of Emperor Zhang of Han, and lasted briefly as empress dowager and regent during the early reign of Emperor He of Han. The biography of Dou Xian can be found in volume 53 of the Hou Hanshu.

== Campaigns against the Xiongnu ==
In 89 AD, Dou Xian led a Han expedition against the Northern Xiongnu. The army advanced from Jilu, Manyi, and Guyang in three great columns. In the summer of 89, the forces—comprising a total of 40,000 troops—assembled at Zhuoye Mountain. Near the end of the campaign, Dou's forces chased the Northern Chanyu into the Altai Mountains, killing 13,000 Xiongnu and accepting the surrender of 200,000 Xiongnu from 81 tribes. A light cavalry of 2,000 was sent towards the Xiongnu at Hami, capturing the region from them. Dou Xian marched with his troops in a triumphal progress to the heartland of the Northern Xiongnu's territory and engraved an inscription commemorating the victory on Mount Yanran, before returning to Han. The Han victory in the campaign of 89 AD resulted in the destruction of the Xiongnu state.

In 90 AD, Dou Xian had encamped at Wuwei. He sent Deputy Colonel Yan Pan with 2,000 light cavalry to strike down the final Xiongnu defenses in the Western Regions, capturing Yiwu and receiving the surrender of Jushi. Major Liang Feng was dispatched to capture the Northern Chanyu, which he did, but he was forced to leave him behind as Dou Xian had already broken camp and returned to China. In the tenth month of 90 AD, Dou Xian sent Liang Feng and Ban Gu to help the Northern Chanyu make preparations for his planned travel as he wished to submit to the Han court in person the following month.

However, this never came to be as Dou Xian dispatched General Geng Kui and Shizi of the Southern Xiongnu with 8,000 light cavalry to attack the Northern Chanyu, encamped at Heyun (河雲), in 90 AD. Once the Han forces arrived at Zhuoye Mountains, they left their heavy equipment behind to launch a swift pincer movement towards Heyun. Geng Kui attacked from the east via the Khangai Mountains and Ganwei River (甘微河), while Shizi attacked from the west via the Western Lake (西海). The Northern Chanyu—said to be greatly shocked by this—launched a counterattack, but he was forced to flee as he left his family and seal behind. The Han killed 8,000 men and captured several thousands. In 91 AD, General Geng Kui and Major Ren Shang with a light cavalry of 800 advanced further via the Juyan Gol (Juyansai) into the Altai Mountains, where the Northern Chanyu had encamped. At the Battle of the Altai Mountains, they massacred 5,000 Xiongnu men and pursued the Northern Chanyu until he escaped to an unknown place. By 91 AD, the last remnants of the Northern Xiongnu had migrated west towards the Ili River valley.

== Downfall ==
In 92, the Dous suddenly fell from grace as the result of a coup d'état. The details are unclear now, but it appeared that Emperor He, perhaps encouraged by his brother Prince Qing (whose mother had died at the Dous' hand and whose status as crown prince had been stripped away by their machinations) and the eunuch Zheng Zhong (鄭眾), made sudden orders to the imperial guards to have them arrest Dou Xian's associates and execute them. He sent Dou Xian and his brothers back to their marches, but eventually ordered them to commit suicide, with the exception of Dou Gui. Empress Dowager Dou remained empress dowager, but lost all power.

== Inscription of Yanran ==
The Inscription of Yanran, composed by Ban Gu and engraved on Mount Yanran to commemorate Dou Xian's victory against the Xiongnu, was recorded in the 5th-century Book of Later Han. The expression "to carve a stone on Yanran" (Chinese: 勒石燕然) entered the Chinese language as a synonym for achieving a decisive victory. In 2016, a researchers team of Mongolian national university expedition rediscovered the inscription in the Inil (Delgerkhangai) Mountains in southern Mongolia". The 220 legible characters of the inscription, out of a total of 260, are identical to the text recorded in the Book of the Later Han.
