= Kafir-kala (Uzbekistan) =

Archaeological site in Uzbekistan

Coordinates: 39.572013°N 67.021506°E

Kafir-kala

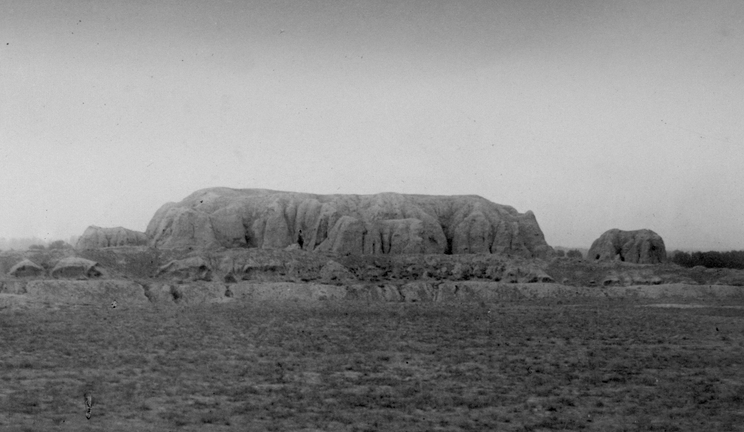
Ruins of Kafir-kala.

Location of Kafir-kala
Kafir-kala (Uzbekistan)
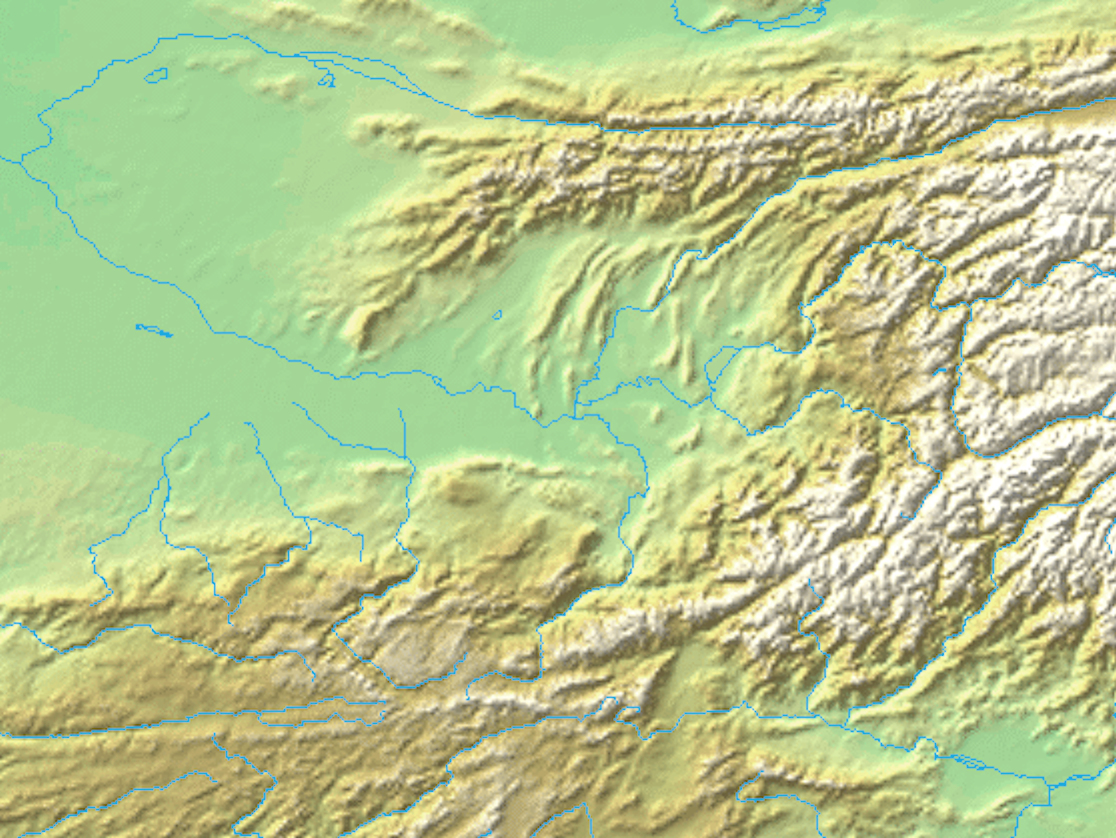
Kafir-kala (Bactria)

Kafir-kala ("Fortress of the infidels") is an ancient fortress beside the Dargom river, 12 kilometers south of the city center of Samarkand in Uzbekistan, protecting the southern border of the Samarkand oasis. It consists of a central citadel built of mudbrick and measuring 75 × 75 meters at its base. It incorporates six towers and is surrounded by a moat, which is still visible today. Living quarters were located outside the citadel.

== Ruins ==
The citadel was first occupied, in the 4th-5th century CE, by the Kidarites, whose coinage and bullae have been found there. A large number of seals were discovered in Kafir Kala, including seals associated with the Kidarites, a notable example being the one mentioning "the king of the Oghlar Huns, the great Kushanshah, the ǝfšyan of Samarkand".

Many examples of coinage were excavated in Kafir-kala, which also show the transition from Sogdian to Islamic rule in the area of Samarkand with good precision.

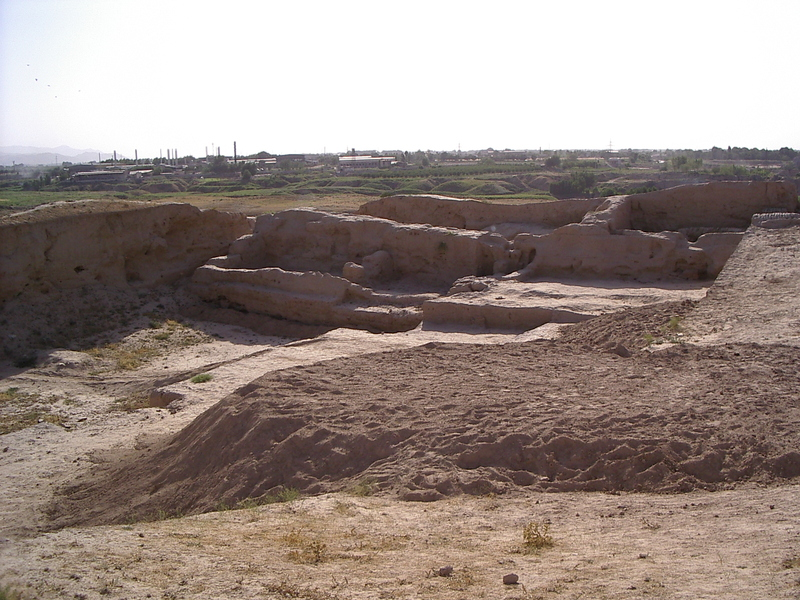
Ruined mudbrick walls of Kafir Kala

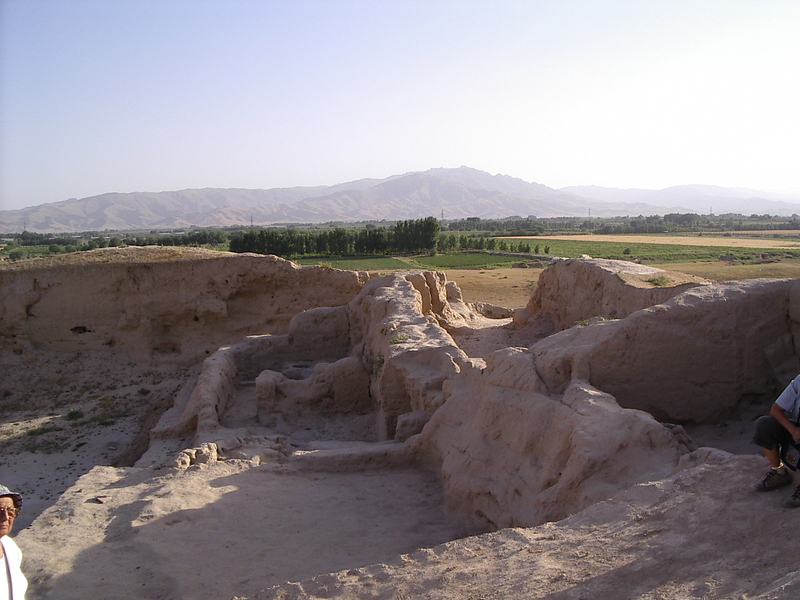
Ruins of Kafir Kala

== Wooden gate ==
Reconstruction of the Kafir Kala gate by Sultanova (2017).

A charred wooden gate with elaborate decorations was discovered in 2017 in the throne room of the ruins of Kafir-kala, and was probably the gate to the throne room itself. The sculptures on the door represent adoration scenes honouring the goddess Nana, who is depicted centrally, seated in majesty on a lion throne.

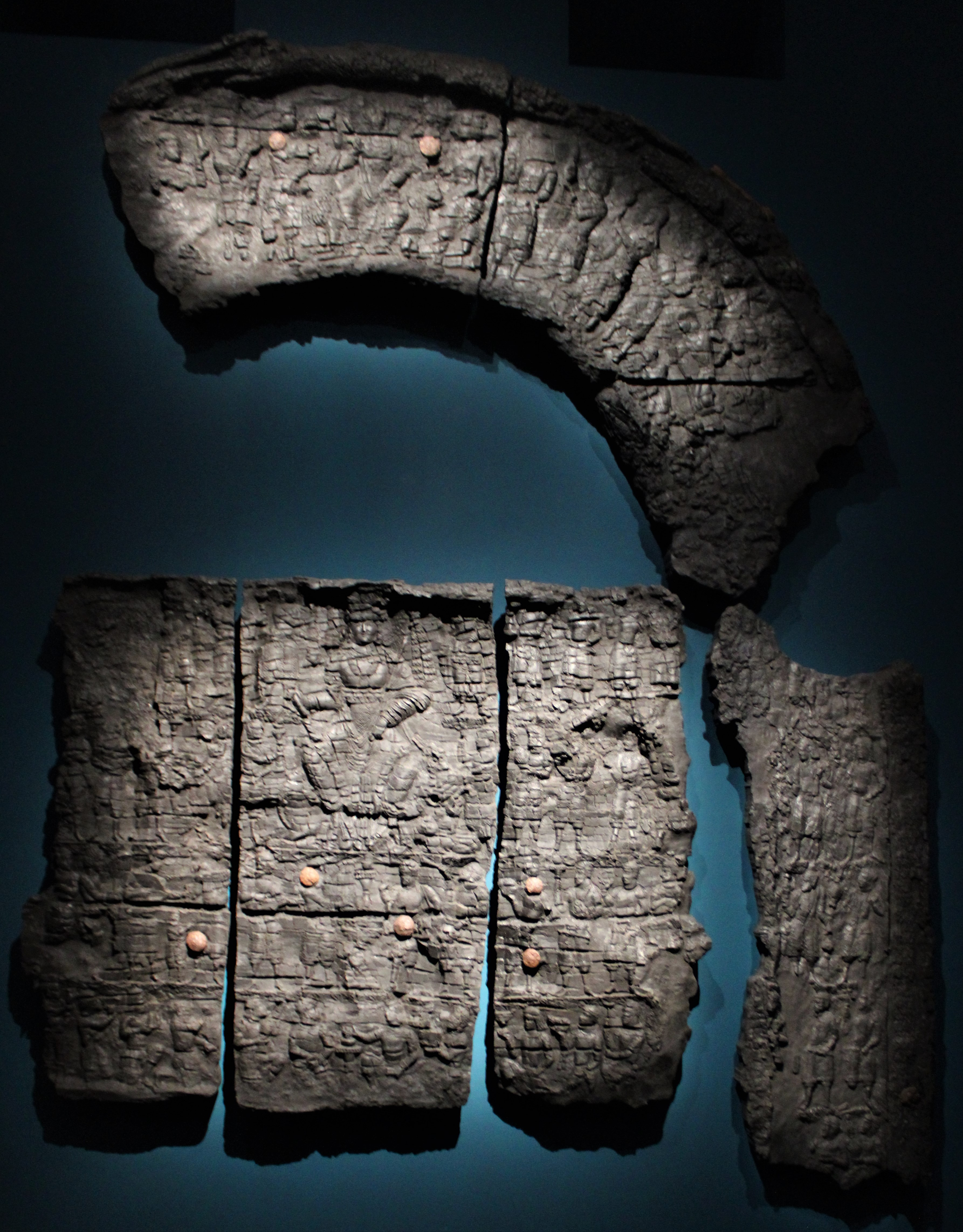
Charred wooden gate, decorated with Goddess Nana and worshippers. Kafir-kala, Uzbekistan, 6th century CE.

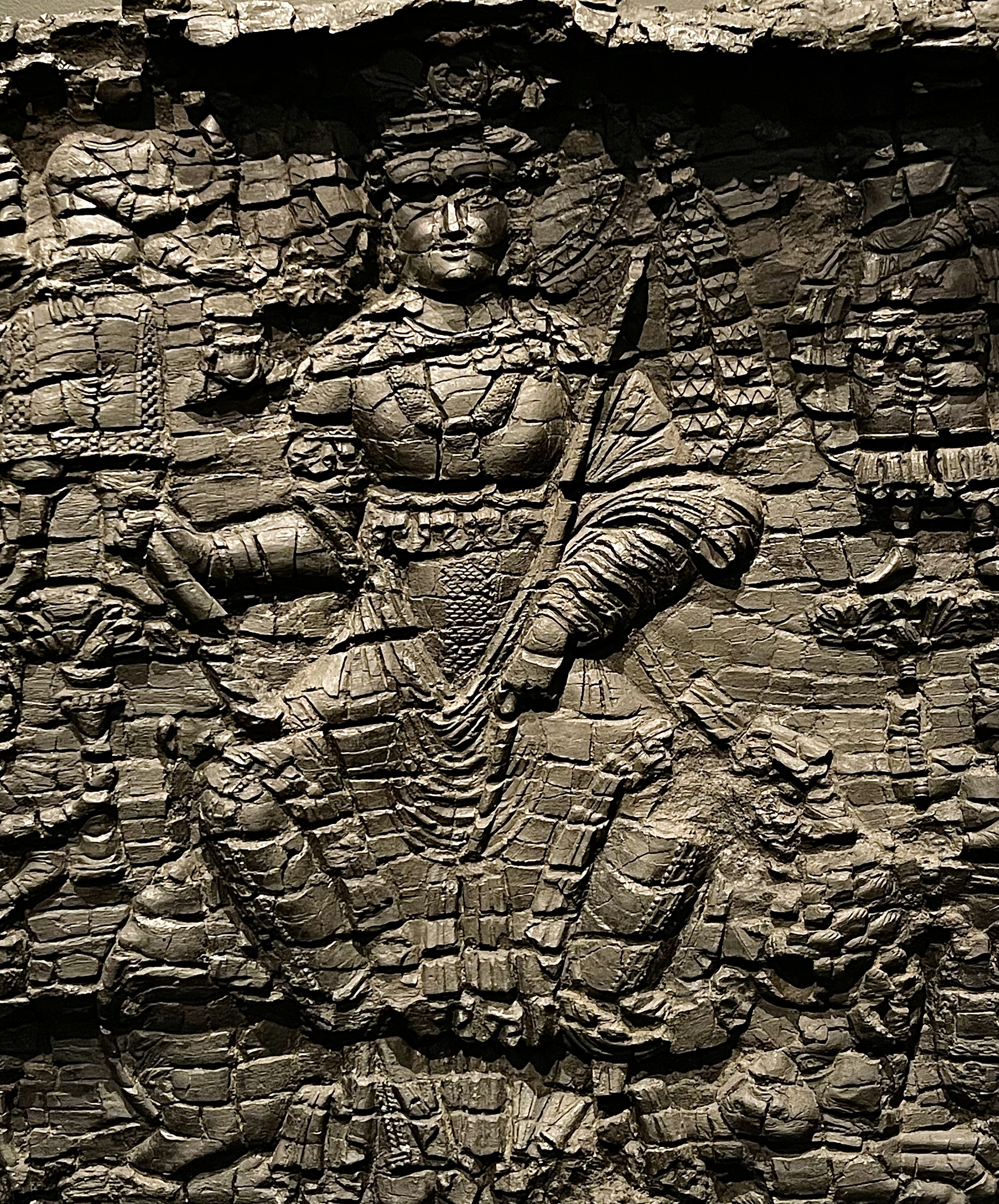
Goddess Nana, 6th century CE. Kafir Kala, Uzbekistan

The worshippers are dressed in knee-length tunics and long boots worn over trousers - a clothing style reminiscent of that depicted in the Penjikent murals - and wear shoulder ribbons of the type associated with Hephthalite nobility. The gate is dated to the first half of the 6th century CE (500-550 CE), and the destruction of the palace is attributed to the Islamic conquest of Samarkand in 712 CE. By a happy chance, the partial carbonising of the low-relief carvings has served to help in their preservation, when the aim of those who attempted to burn them was undoubtedly their destruction (which would have been achieved had they been reduced to ash, rather than effectively converted to charcoal).

Some details of the attendants

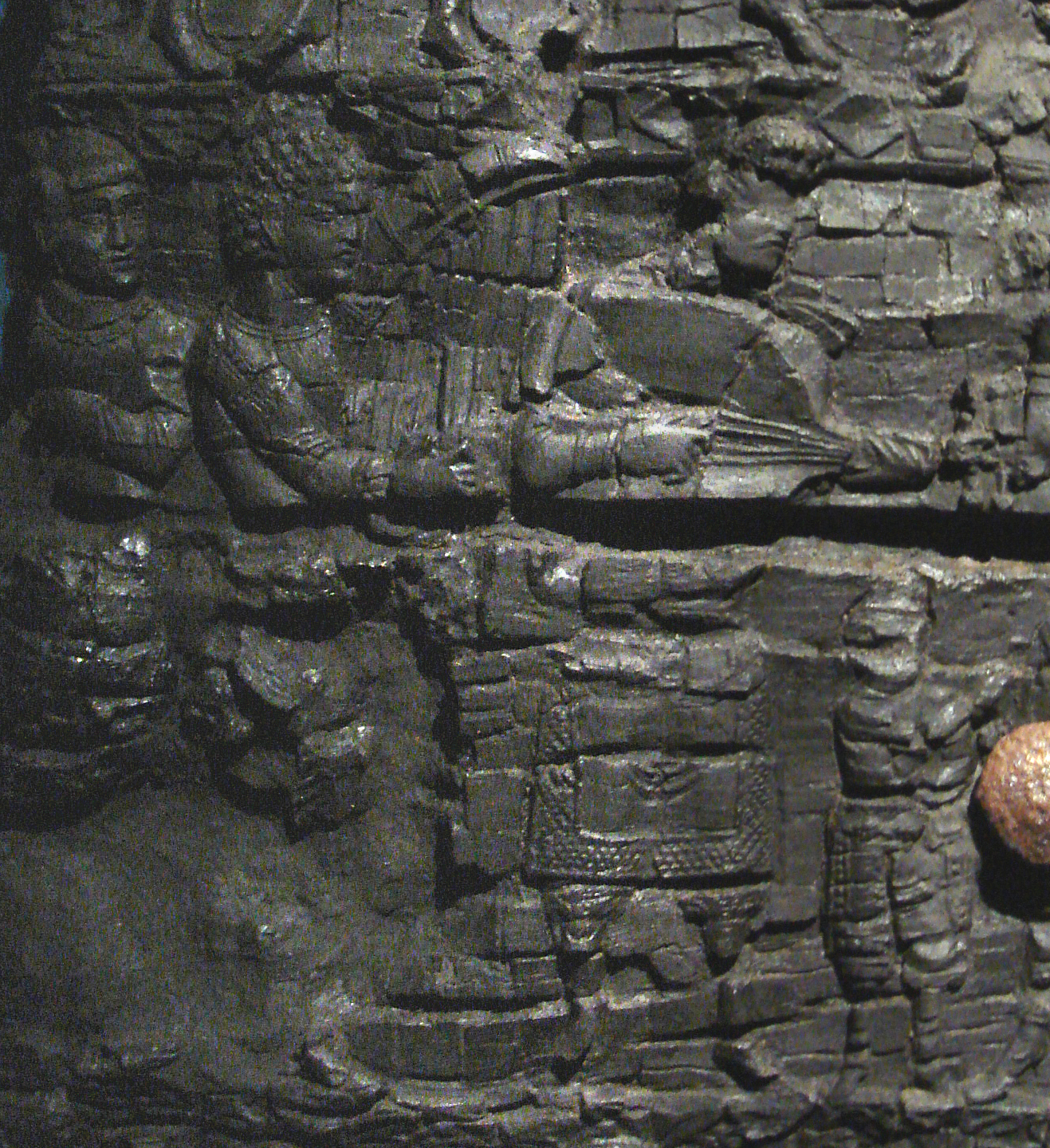
Musicians and child

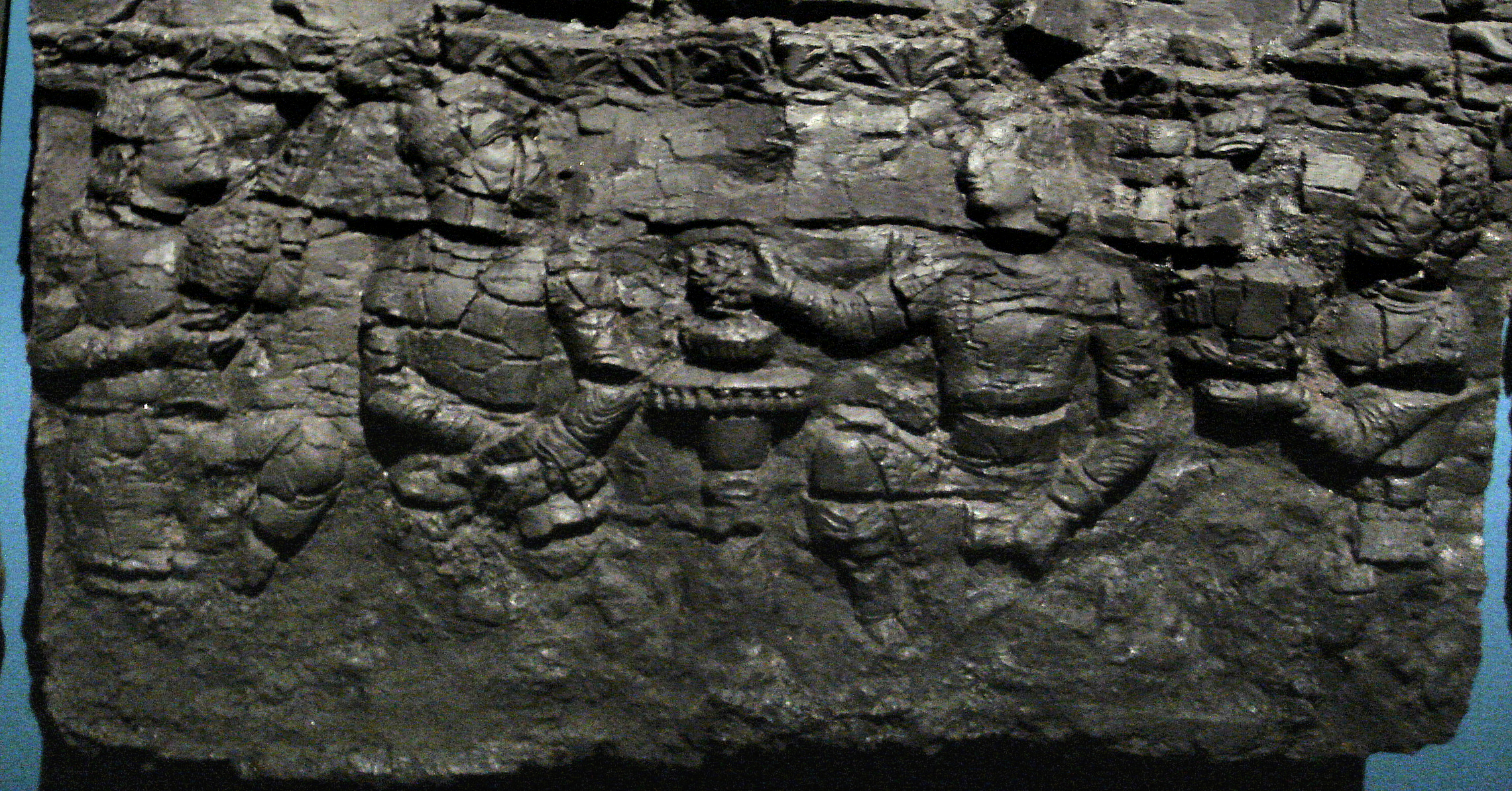
Devotees around a fire altar

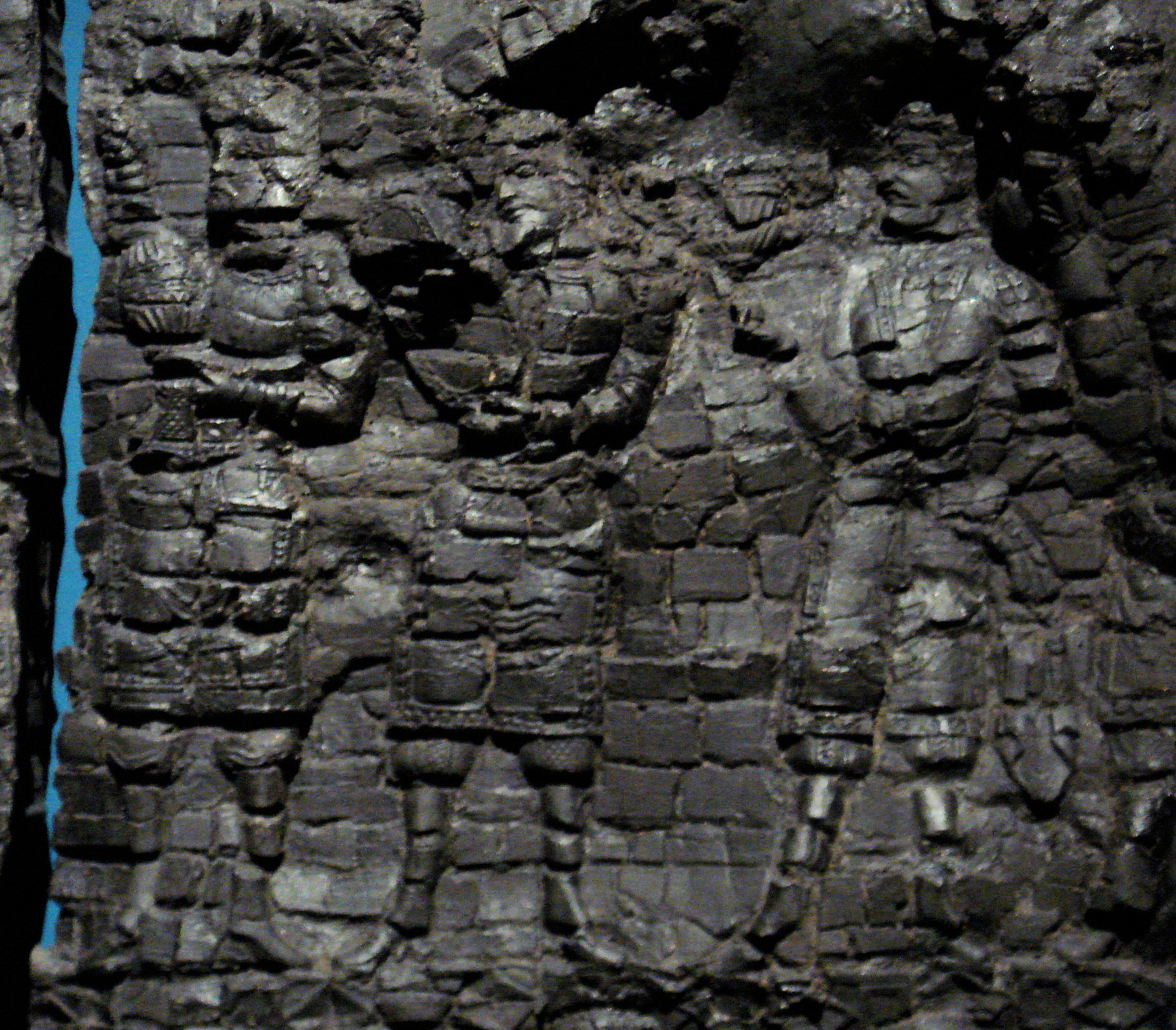
Standing devotees

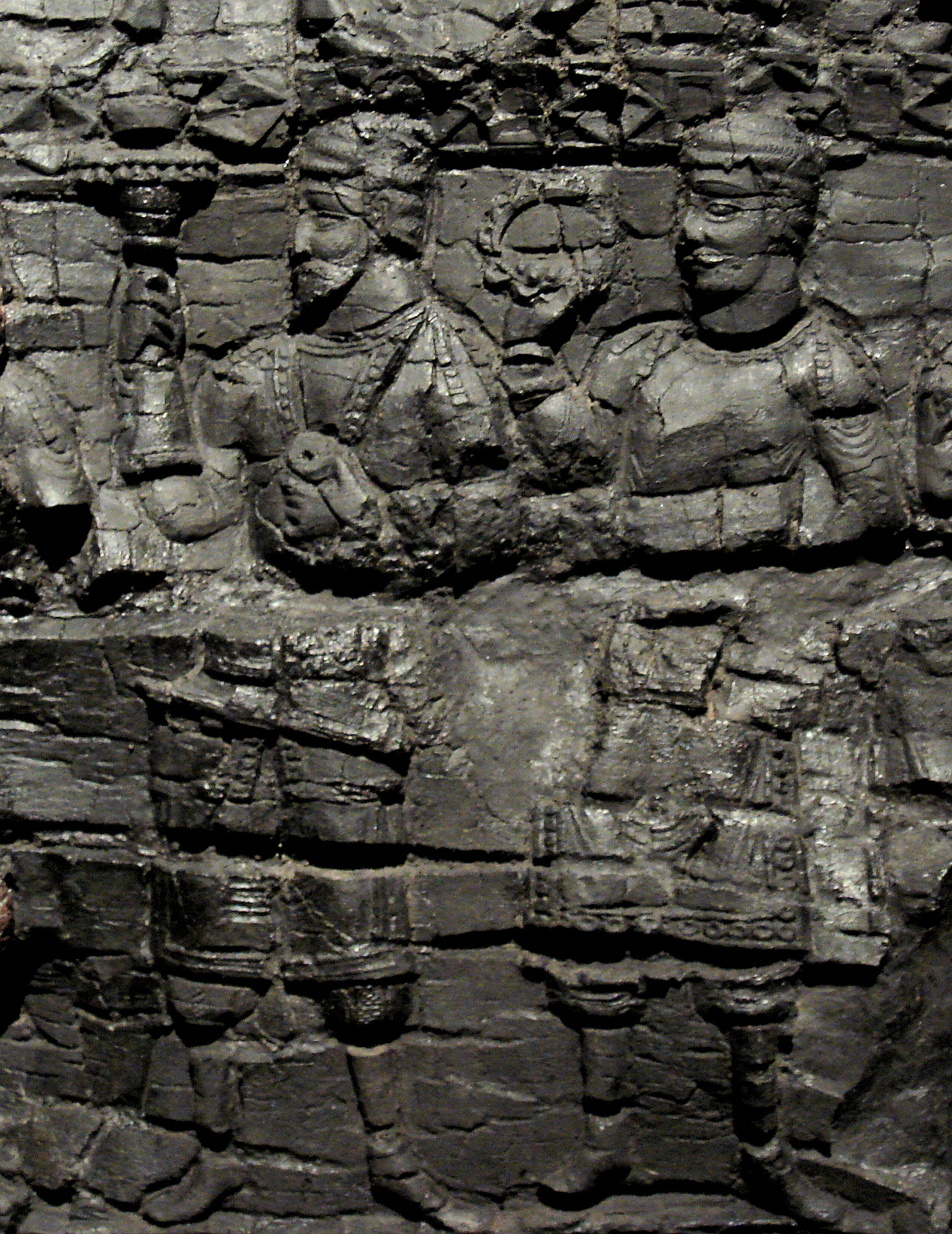
Standing devotees

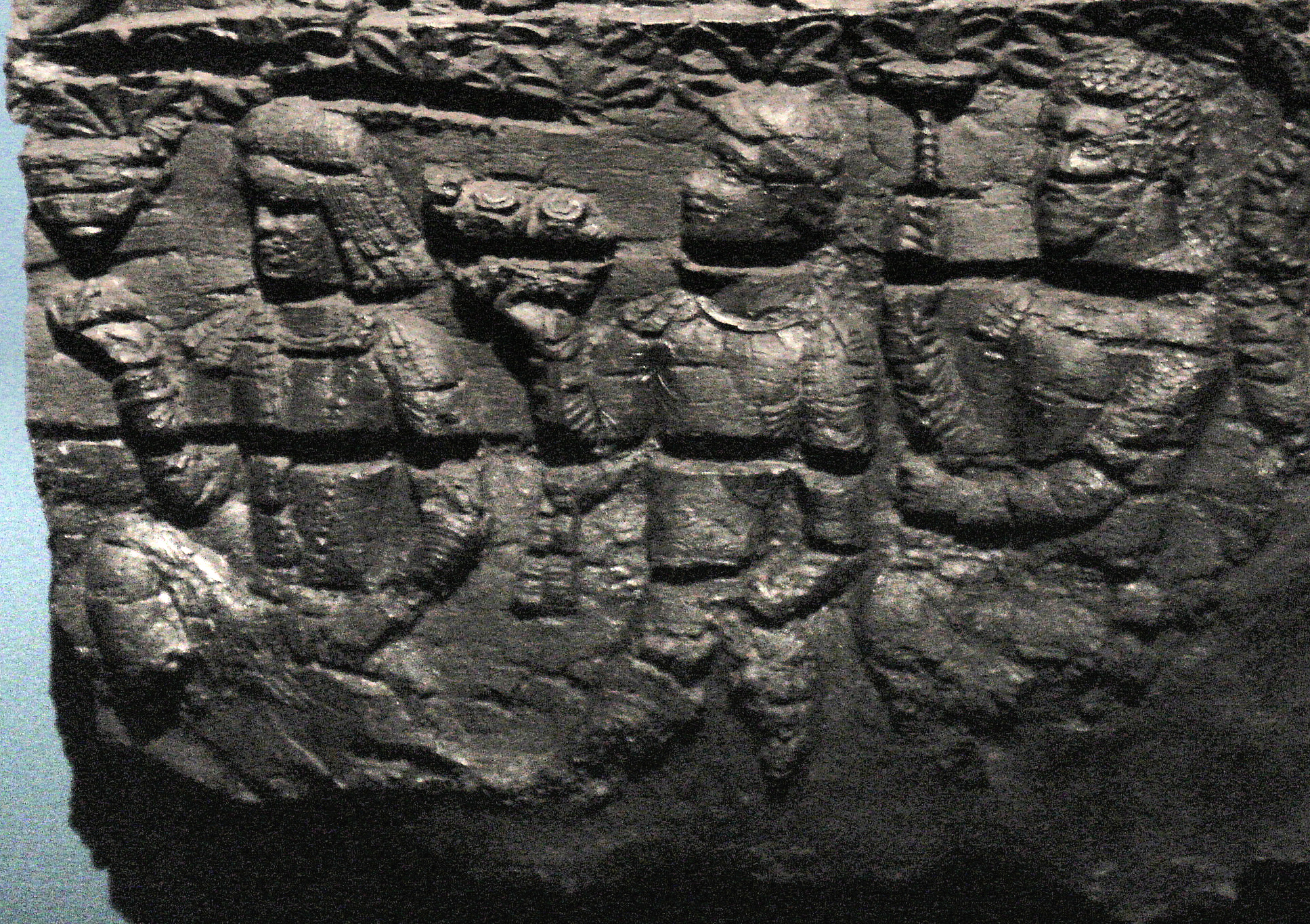
Kneeling devotees

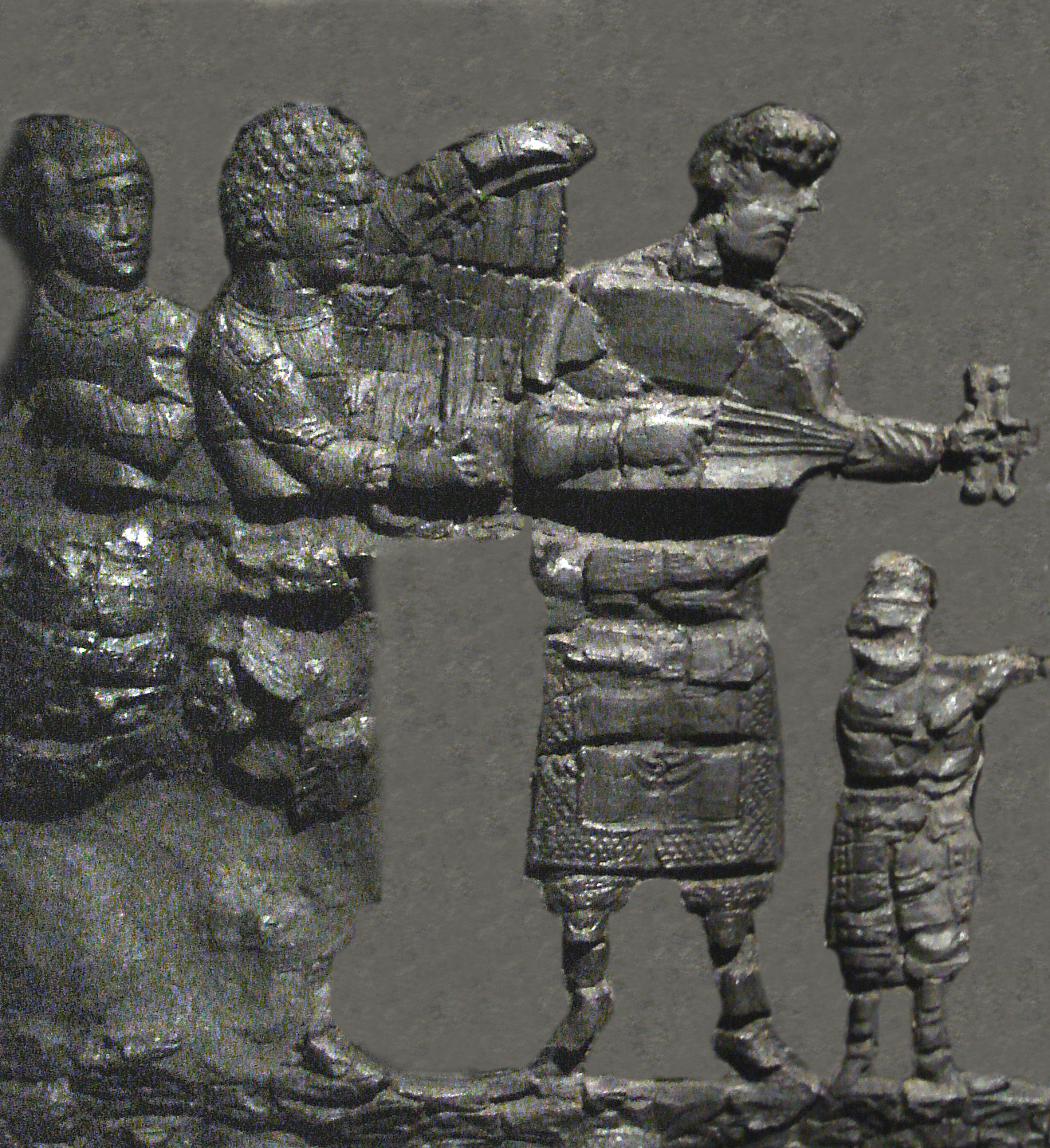
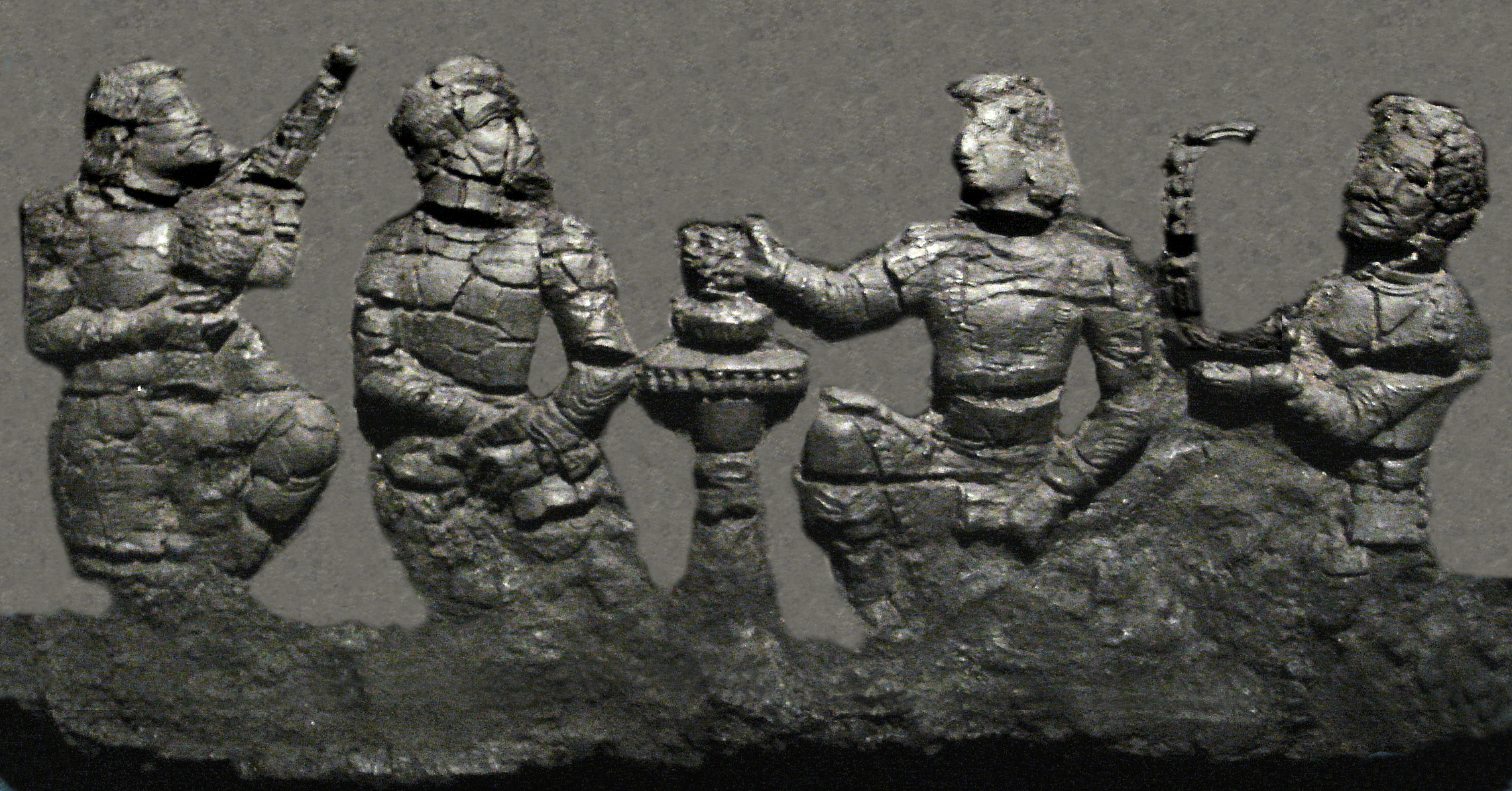
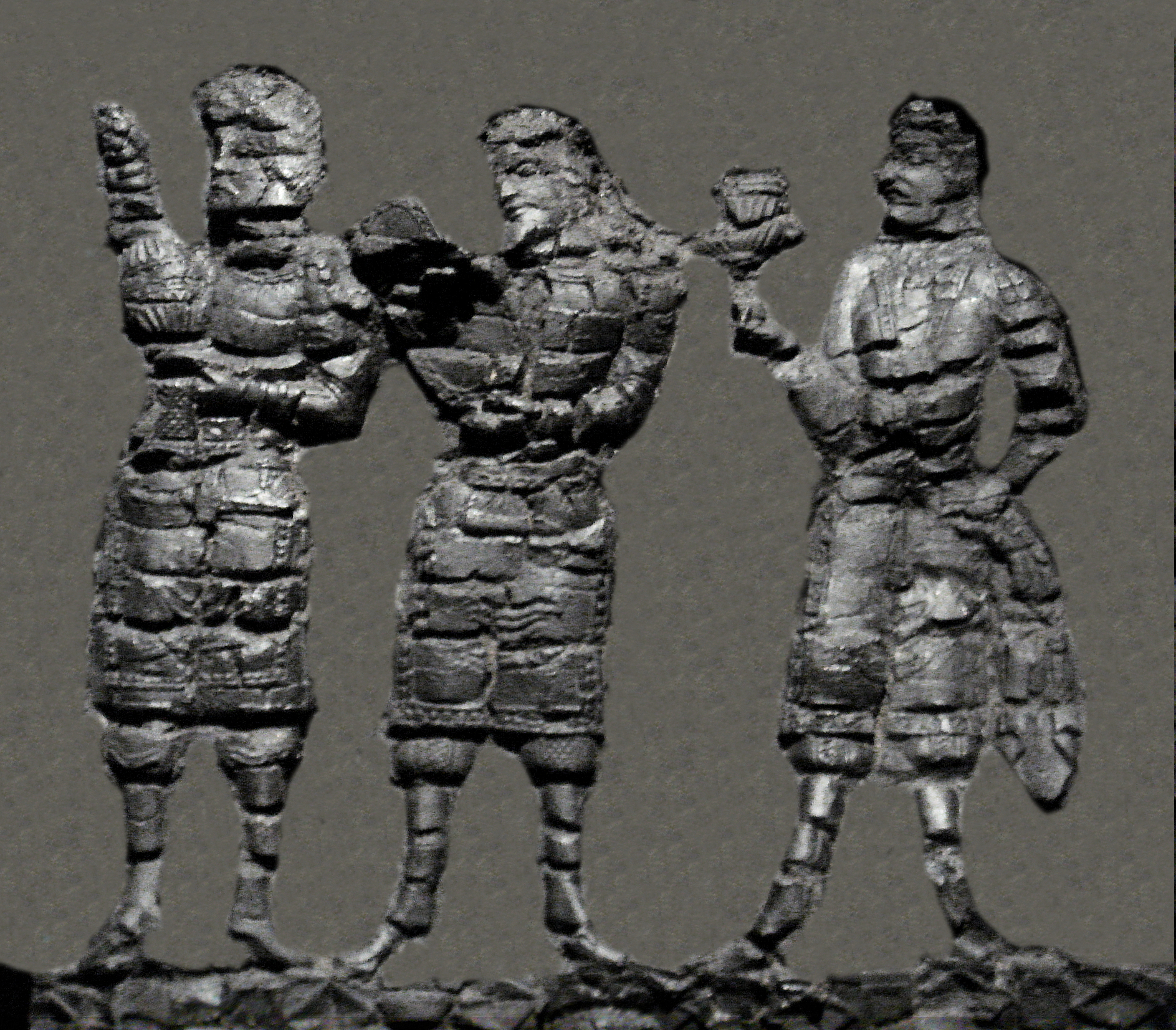
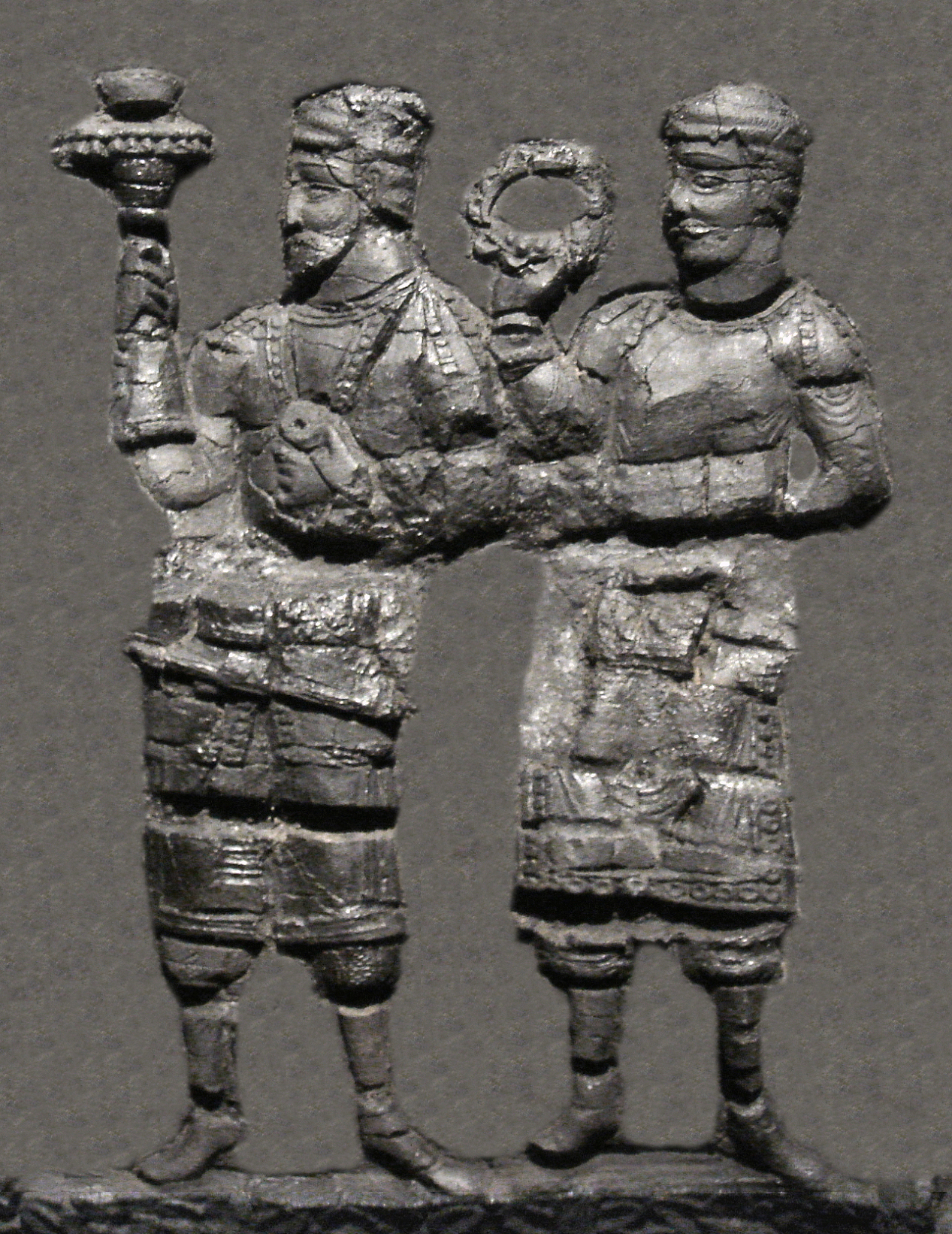
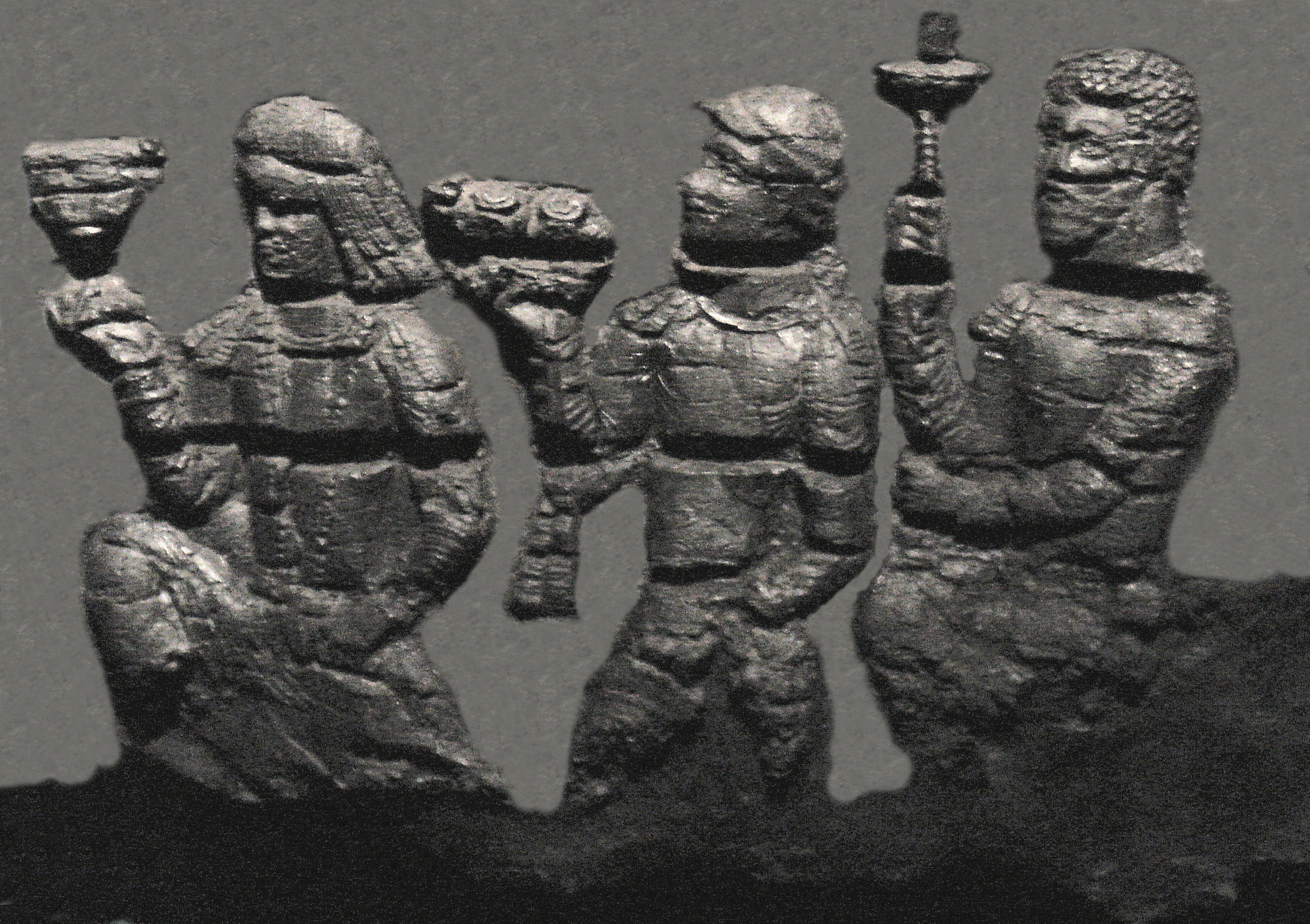

== Artifacts ==
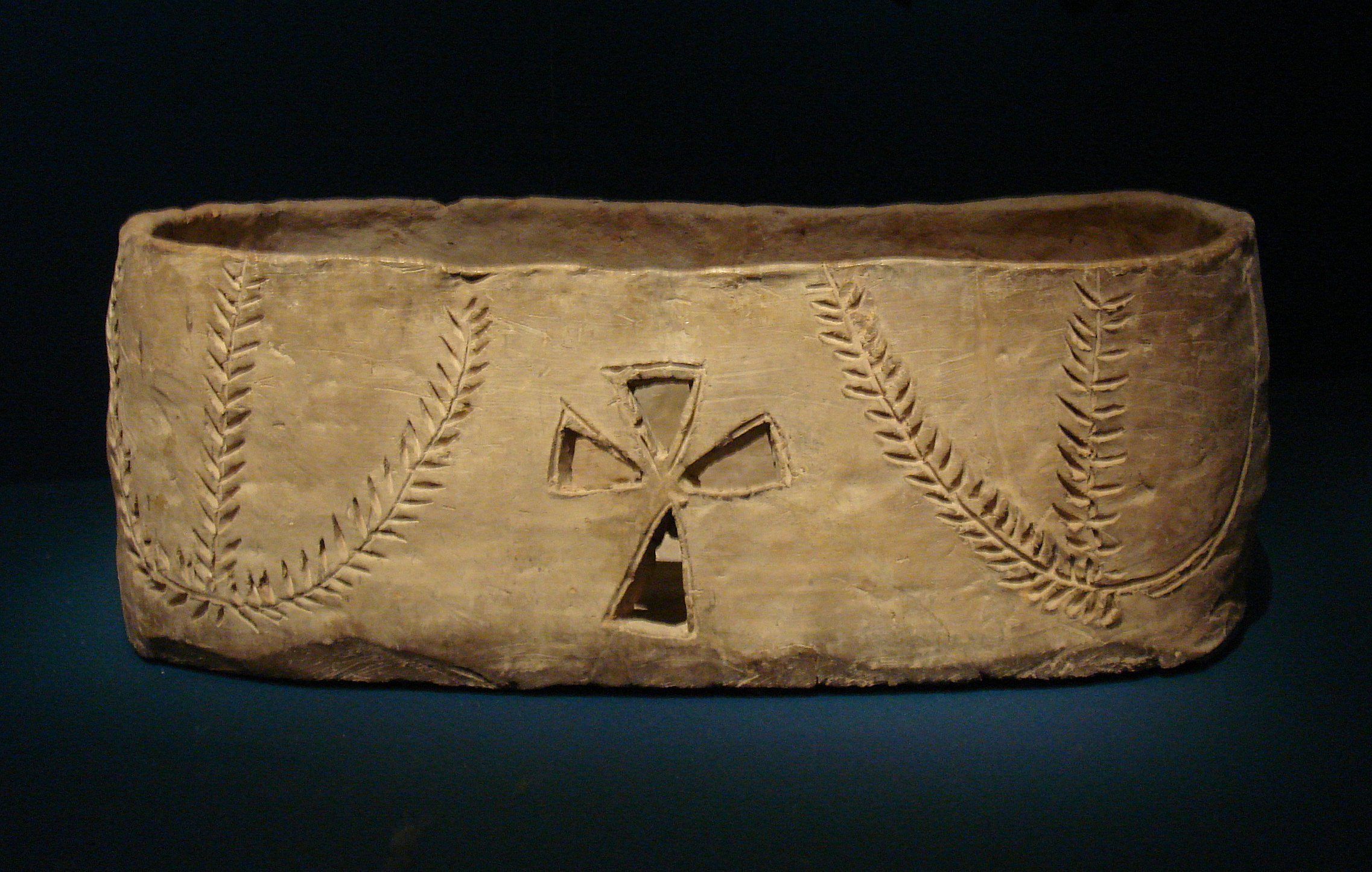
Zoroastrian ossuary, 6-7th century CE, Kafir Kala, Uzbekistan.

A Zoroastrian ossuary (with the shape of a cross, but unrelated to Christianity), dated 6-7th century CE, was also discovered in Kafir Kala. Numerous seals and pottery items have also been found.

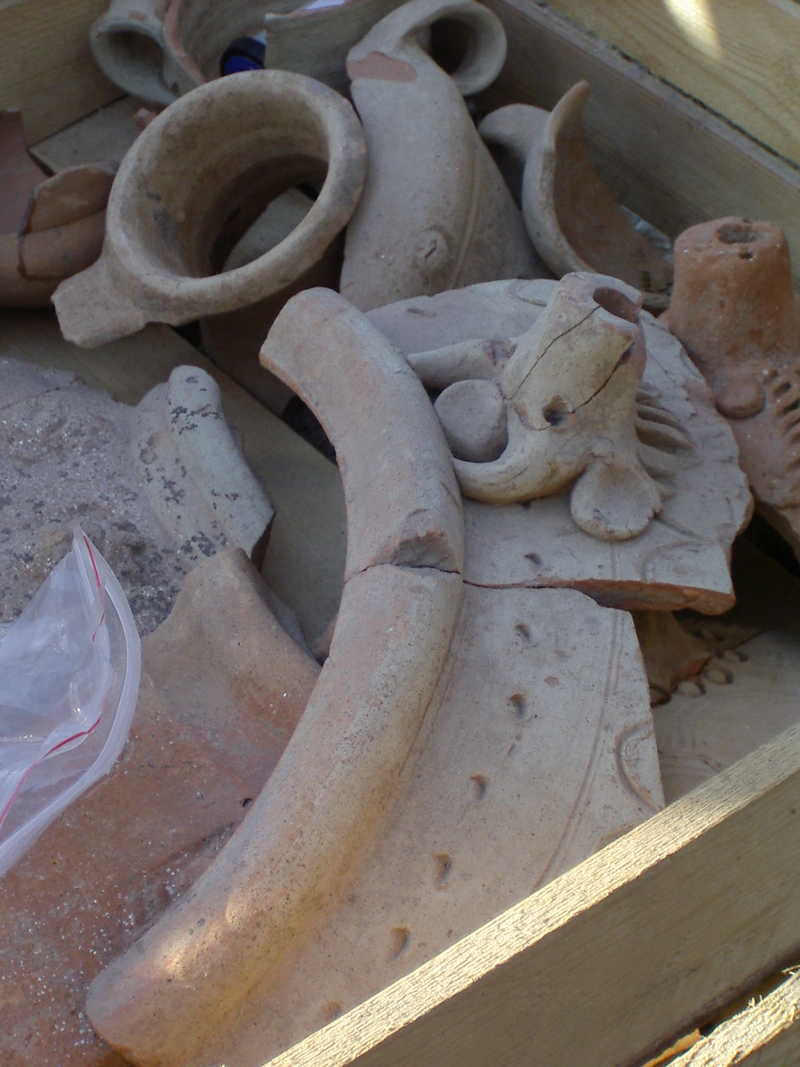
Kafir Kala pottery finds

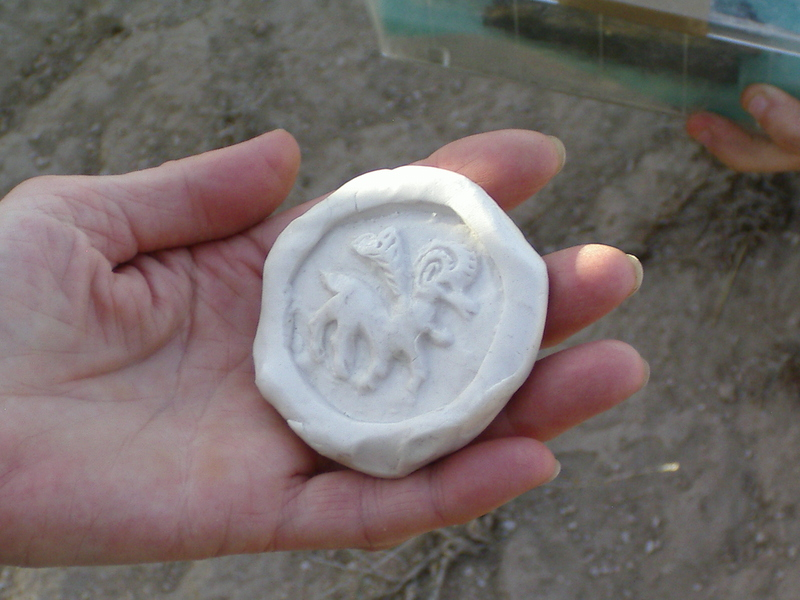
Seal depicting a sheep or goat-like creature

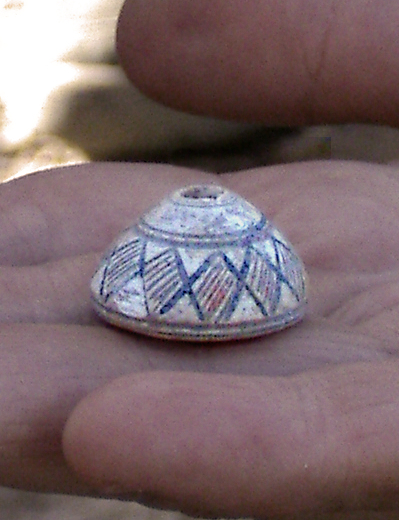
Miniature pottery vase with geometric pattern

== Parallels ==
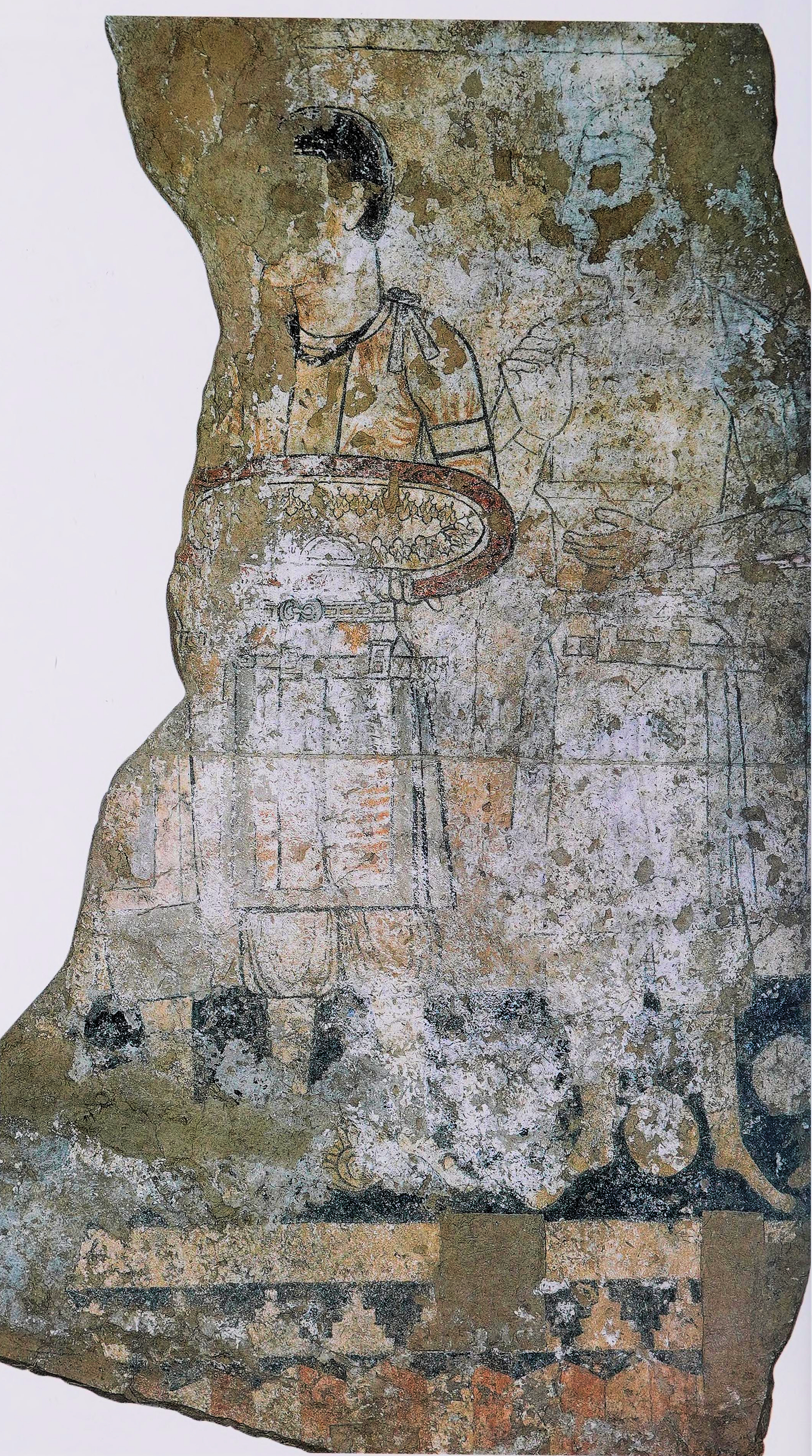
Penjikent murals donors, Temple II, circa 500 CE.

Some of the attendants in the murals of Penjikent are similar to the attendants in the Kafir-kala gate: adorants dressed in knee-length tunics, with long boots over large trousers, large necklaces, and shoulder ribbons which have been associated with Hephthalite nobility. These Penjikent murals are dated to circa 500 CE.
