= Penjikent murals =

Pre-Islamic murals in Tajikistan

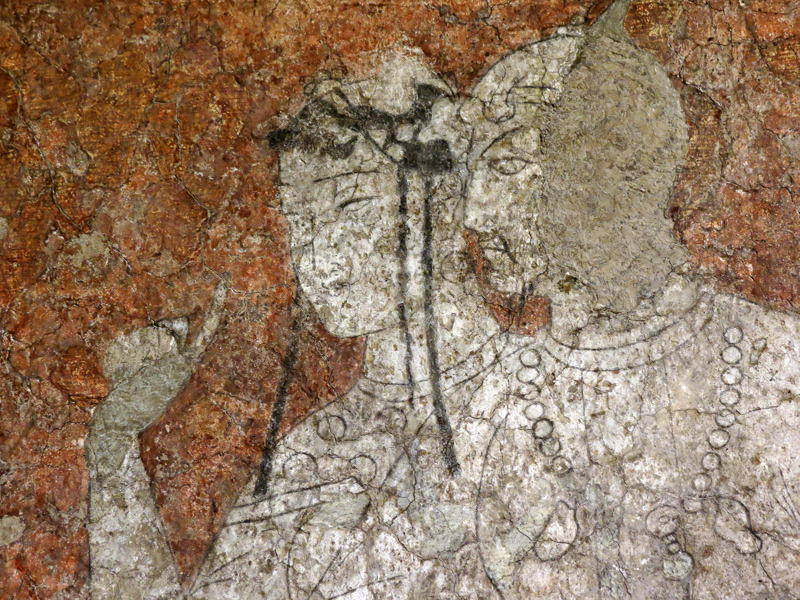
- Penjikent mural in the Hermitage Museum, Saint Petersburg.
- Created: 5th century - 722 CE
- Discovered: Panjakent, Tajikistan; 39.486792°N 67.620477°E
- Present location: Hermitage Museum, National Museum of Antiquities of Tajikistan
- Culture: Sogdian

Location
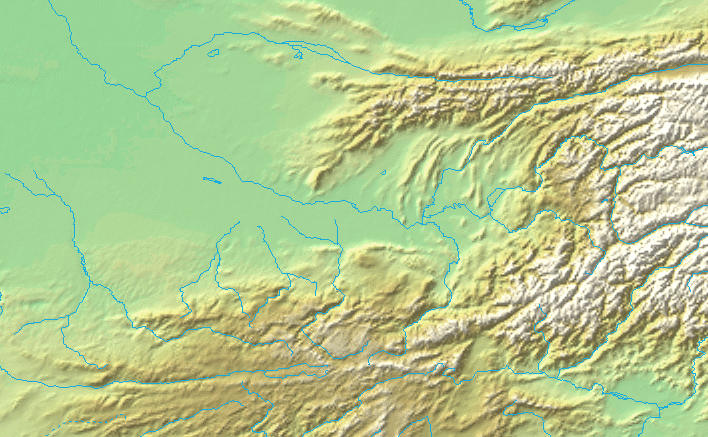

The murals of Penjikent are among the most famous murals of the pre-Islamic period in Panjakent, ancient Sogdiana, in Tajikistan. Numerous murals were recovered from the site, and many of them are now on display in the Hermitage Museum in Saint Petersburg, and in the National Museum of Antiquities of Tajikistan in Dushanbe. The murals reveal the cosmopolitan nature of the Penjikent society that was mainly composed of Sogdian and Turkic elites and likely other foreign merchant groups of heterogeneous origin. Significant similarities with Old Turkic clothing, weaponry, hairstyles and ritual cups are noted by comparative research.

The murals of Penjikent are the earliest known Sogdian murals, starting from the late 5th to early 6th century CE, and are preceded by the Hepthalite murals of Tukharistan as seen in Balalyk Tepe, from which they received iconographical and stylistic influence. Also visible is a great variety of Hellenistic influences of Greek decorative styles along with local Zoroastrian, Christian, Buddhist and Indic cults.

The production of paintings started at the end of the 5th century CE and stopped in 722 CE with the invasion of the Abbasid Caliphate, in the Muslim conquest of Transoxiana, and many works of art were damaged or destroyed at that time.

== Rulers ==
There are three known rulers of Penjikent:

1. Čamughyan/Gamaukyan (end of the 7th century)
2. Čekin Čur Bilgä (beginning of the 8th century)
3. Dēwāštič (until 722 A.D.)

All rulers had no reported dynasties, the first ruler had a Chionite-Hephthalite and the second ruler had a Turkic name. There is no conclusive evidence that "Queen Nana" was involved in the minting of the Penjikent coins. There is conflicting information about the father of Čekin Čur Bilgä, known as Pyčwtt, who ruled Penjikent at the beginning of the 7th century and around 658 AD.

== Festivities ==
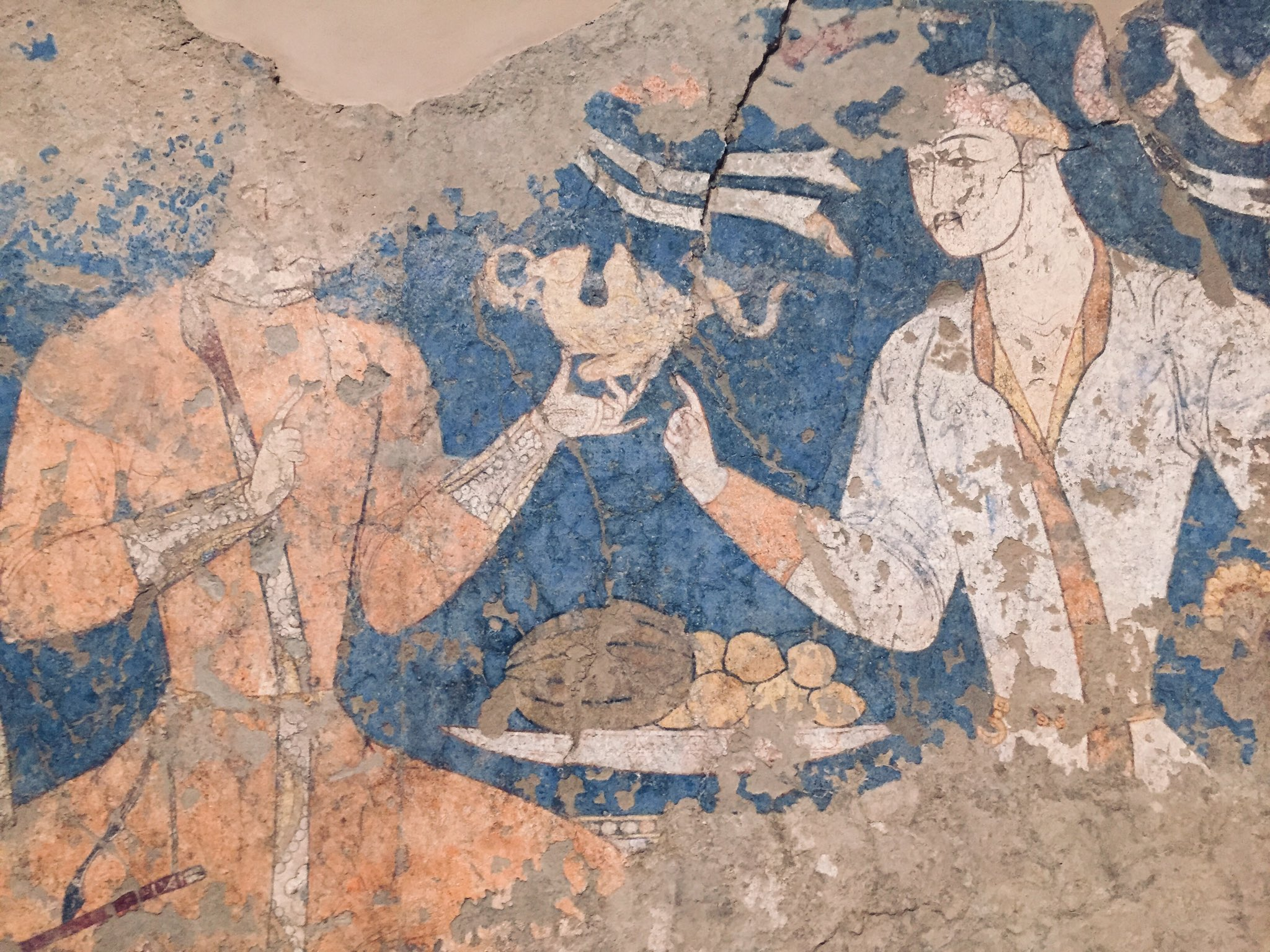
Penjikent murals, detail, banquet with double-lapelled outfits, 5th-8th century

Scenes of festivities abound in the murals. The men sitting in oriental manner are dressed in Turkic long coats with lapels similar to garments found in the Altai. Lapels were not common in Parthian, Kushan, or Sasanian caftans, however they do appear in the art of Hepthalite, Sogdian and Buddhist sites. Images of both sexes in single- and double-lapelled outfits appear in large sites like Samarkand, Pendjikent and Xinjiang. Knauer suggests that the political ascendance of the Western Turks resulted in the adoption of lapels through a diffusion of nomadic Turkic tribes which later became assimilated.

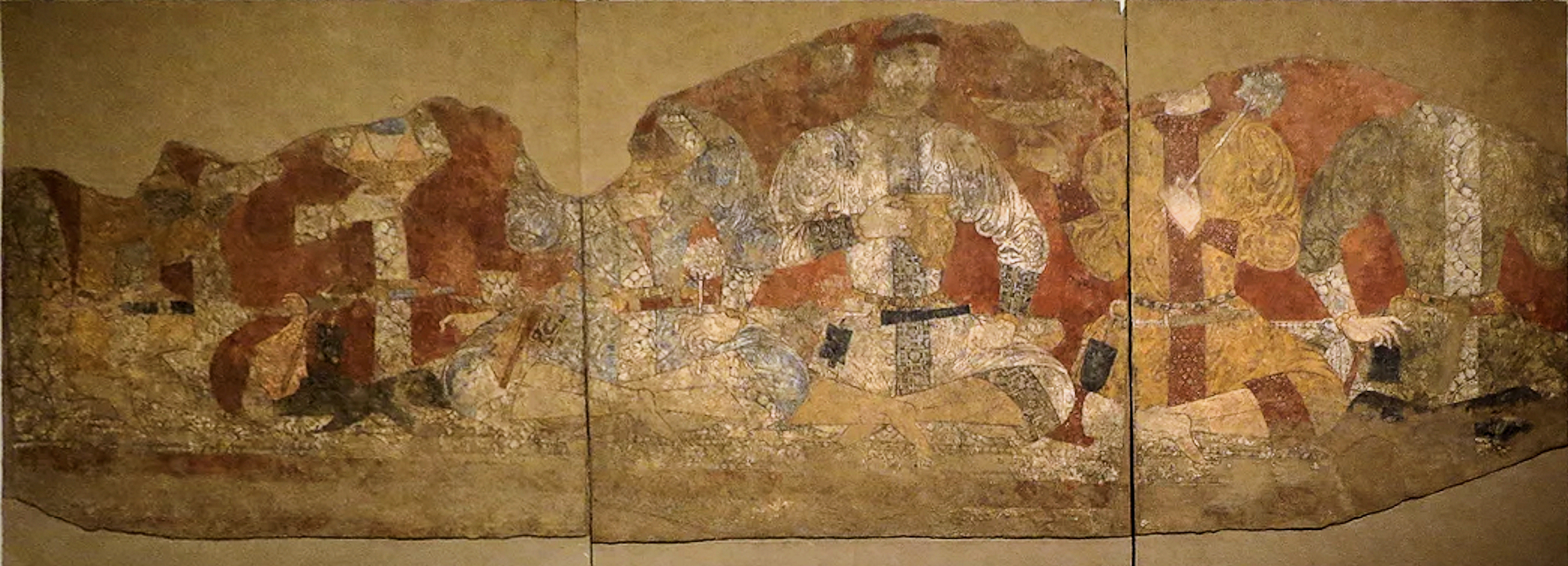
Men banquet, pigment on plaster. Pendjikent, Tajikistan

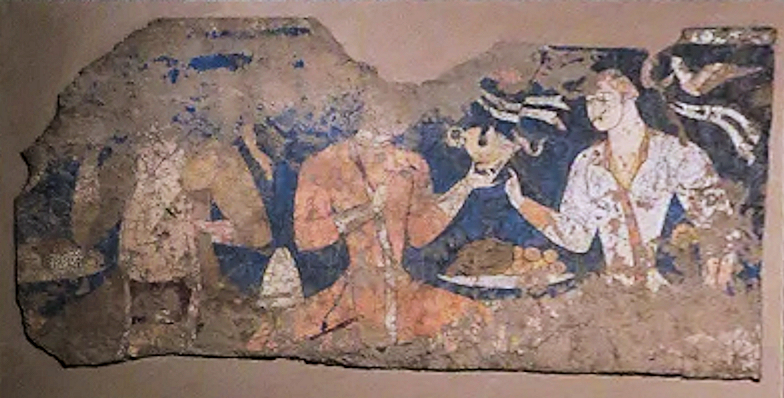
Panjakent (Panjīkant) mural, 6th-8th centuries

== Rostam cycle ==
It is thought that the narrative of the Iranian Shahnameh and the epic cycle of Rostam is mirrored in a series of murals of the "Blue Hall" ("Rustemiada") at Penjikent dating to the first half of the 8th century. They are mainly hosted in the Hermitage Museum, Hall 49, and are believed to be of Sogdian, Turkic or Kushan-Hephthalite origin.

The protagonist Rostam, a mythical king of Zabulistan is thought to be shown in numerous activities and battles, both against human and mythical opponents, and is shown with an elongated skull, narrow skulls, V-shaped eyebrows, a hooked nose and heavy jaw (of Hephthalite prototype) and thus reminding some portraits of Khingila on coins, perhaps even having close identity with him. This choice follows from the emblematic look of the Alchon Huns, who ruled in that same area until the 7th century CE.

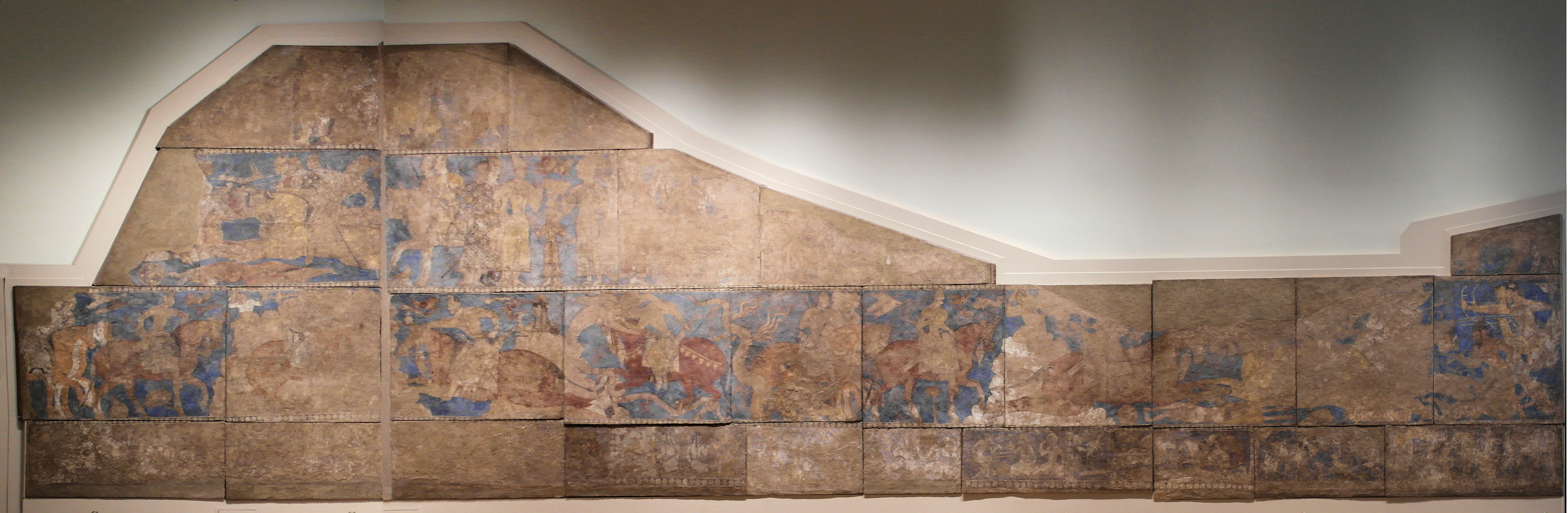
The complete “Rostam“ cycle, in the Hermitage Museum, Hall 49.

=== Details ===
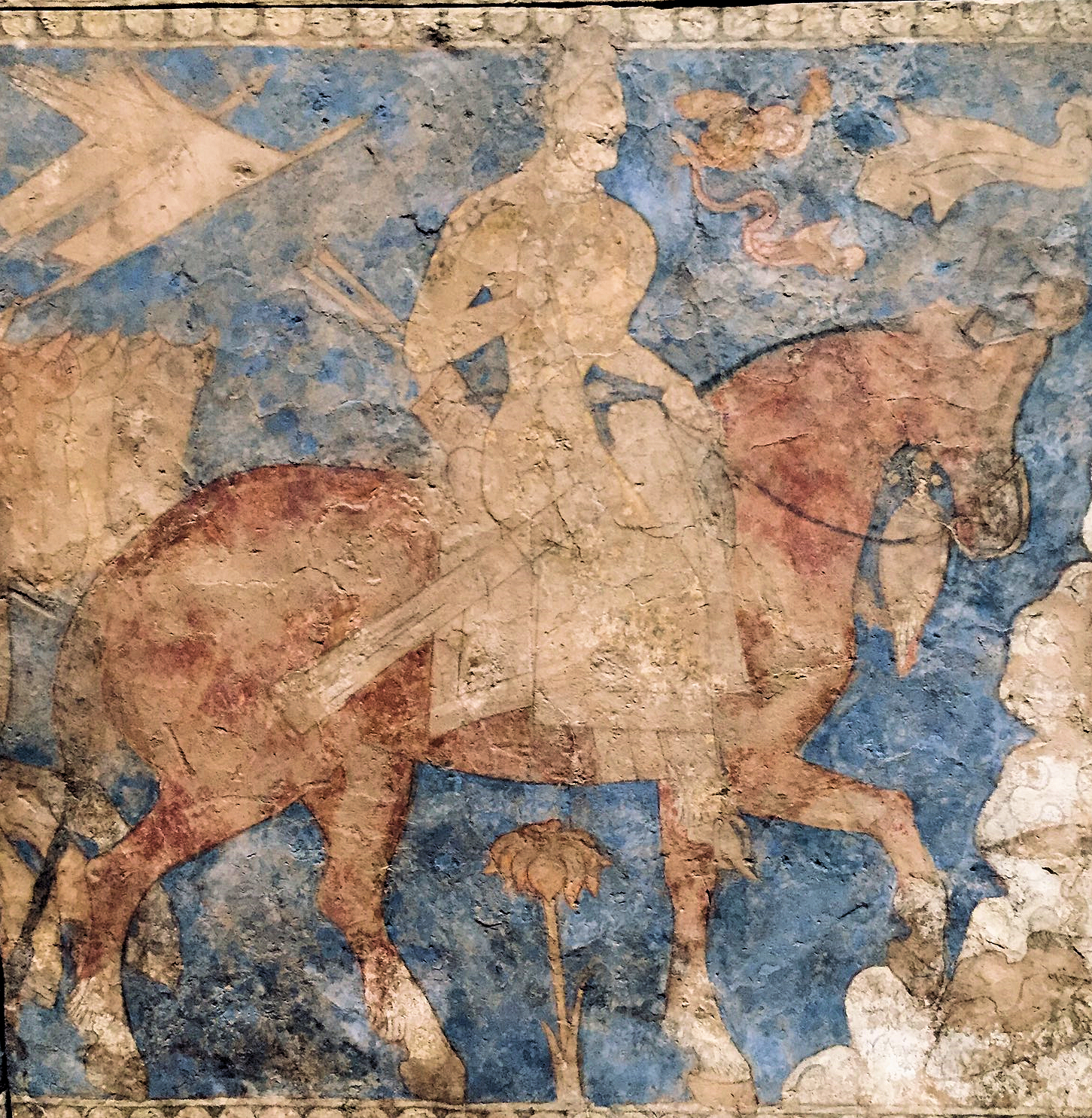
Assumed to be Rostam, with an elongated skull of Hephthalite prototype.

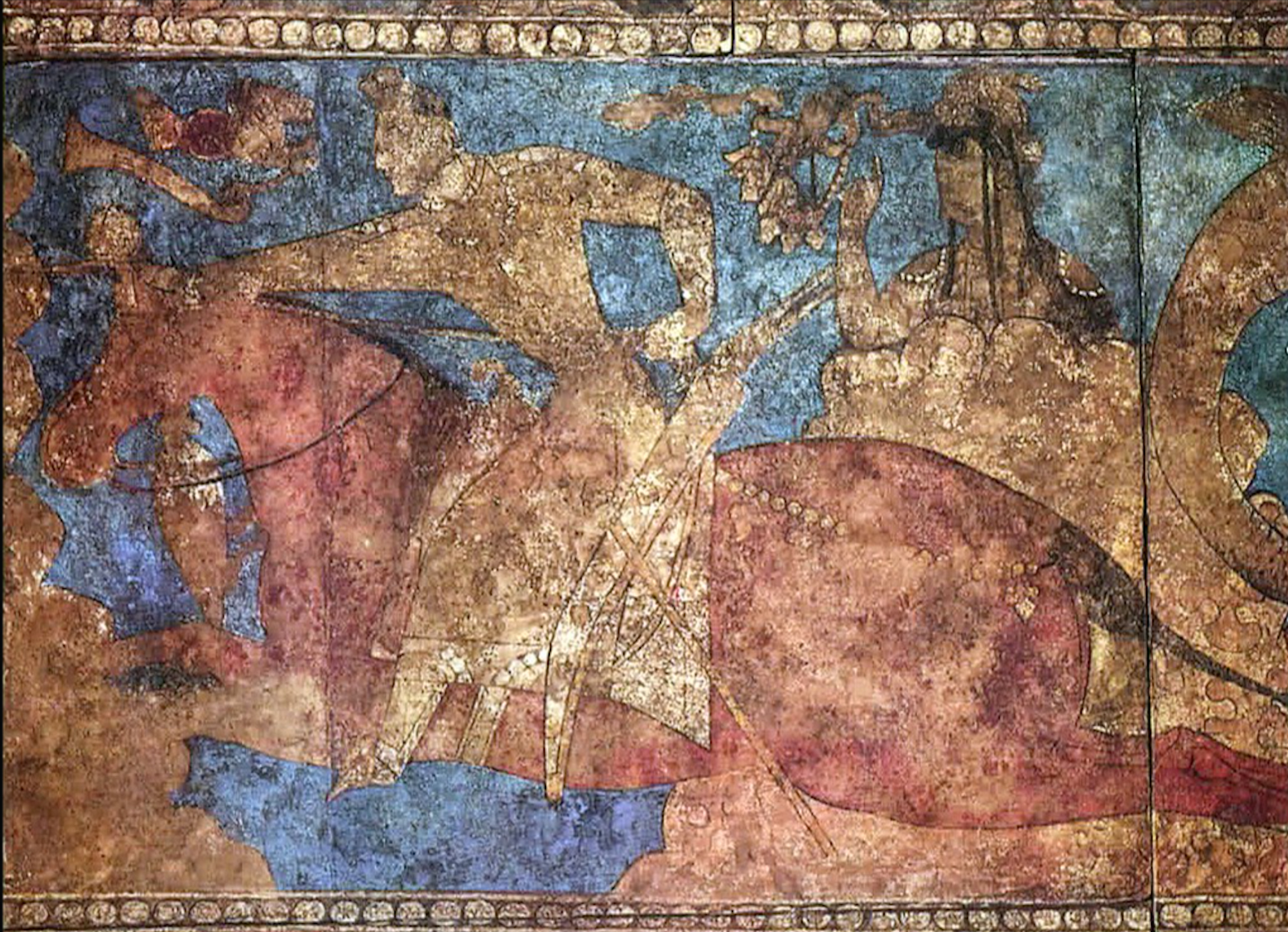
Panjikent mural (6th-7th century CE). Hermitage Museum

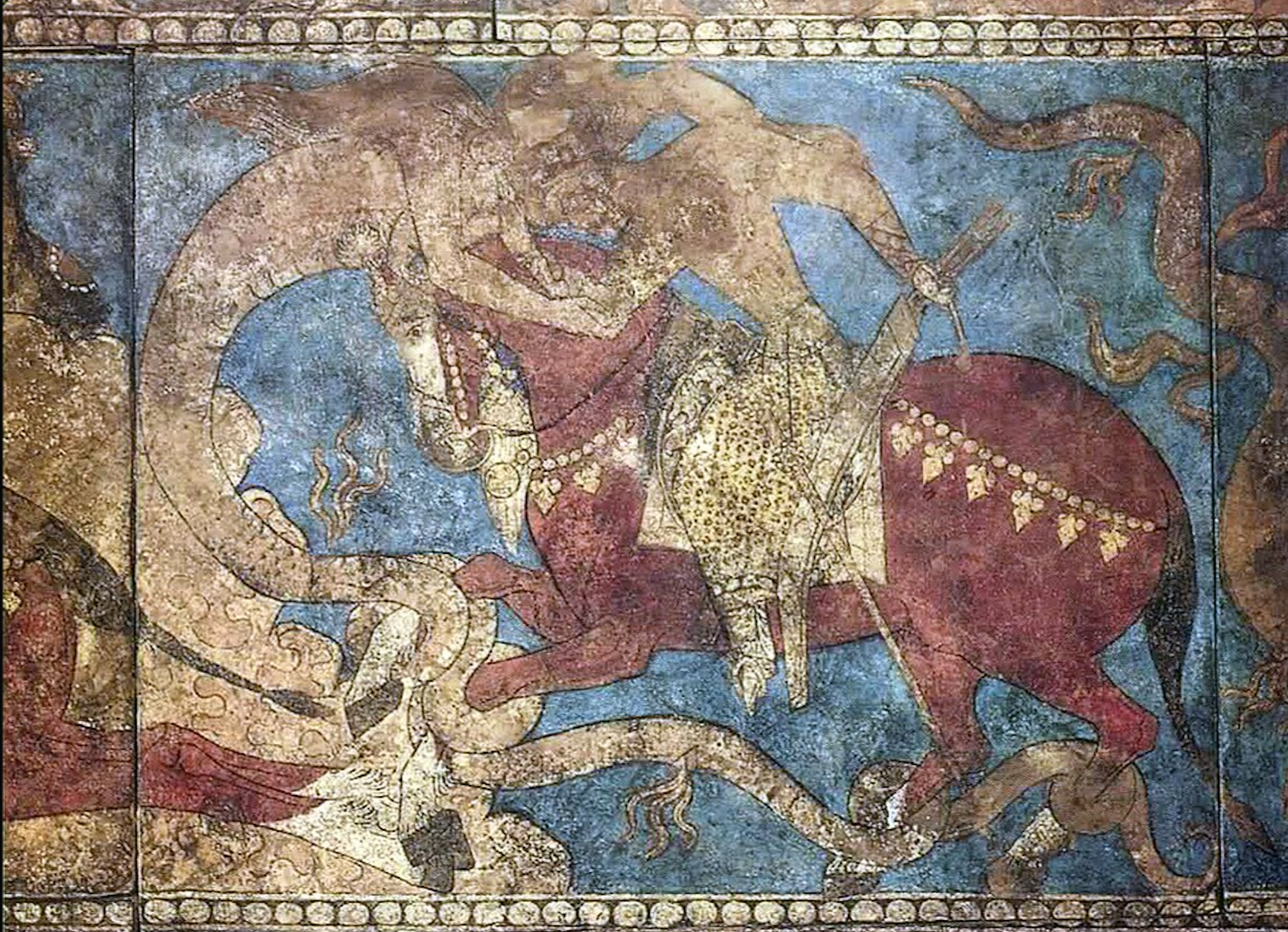
Panjakent (Panjīkant) mural, 6th-8th centuries. Hermitage Museum

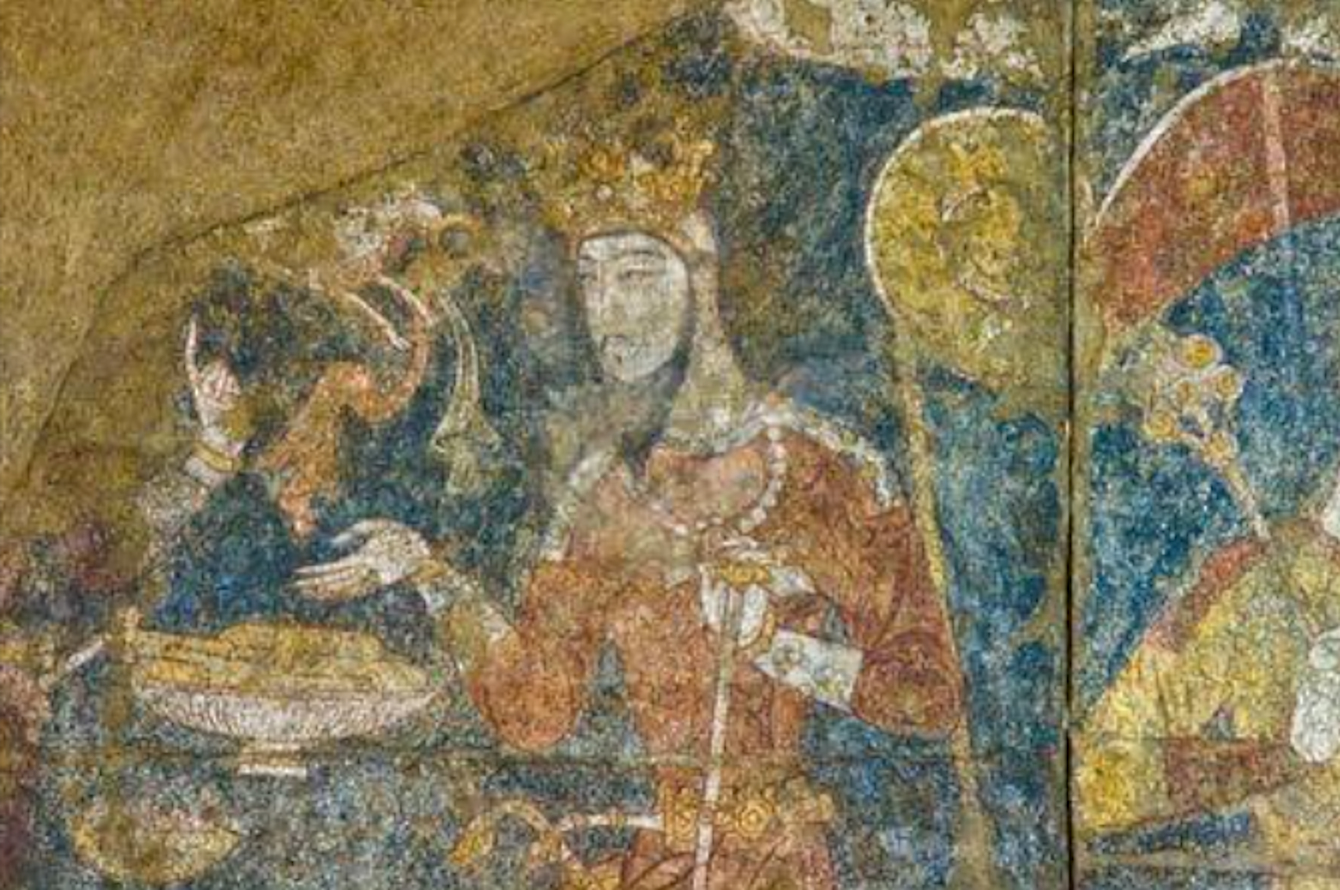
Panjakent (Panjīkant) mural, 6th-8th centuries. National Museum of Antiquities of Tajikistan

== Religion ==
The religious affiliation of the Penjikent population is uncertain. The local cults are thought to have involved a blending of the worship of Christian, Buddhist, Zoroastrian Iranian and Hindu deities.

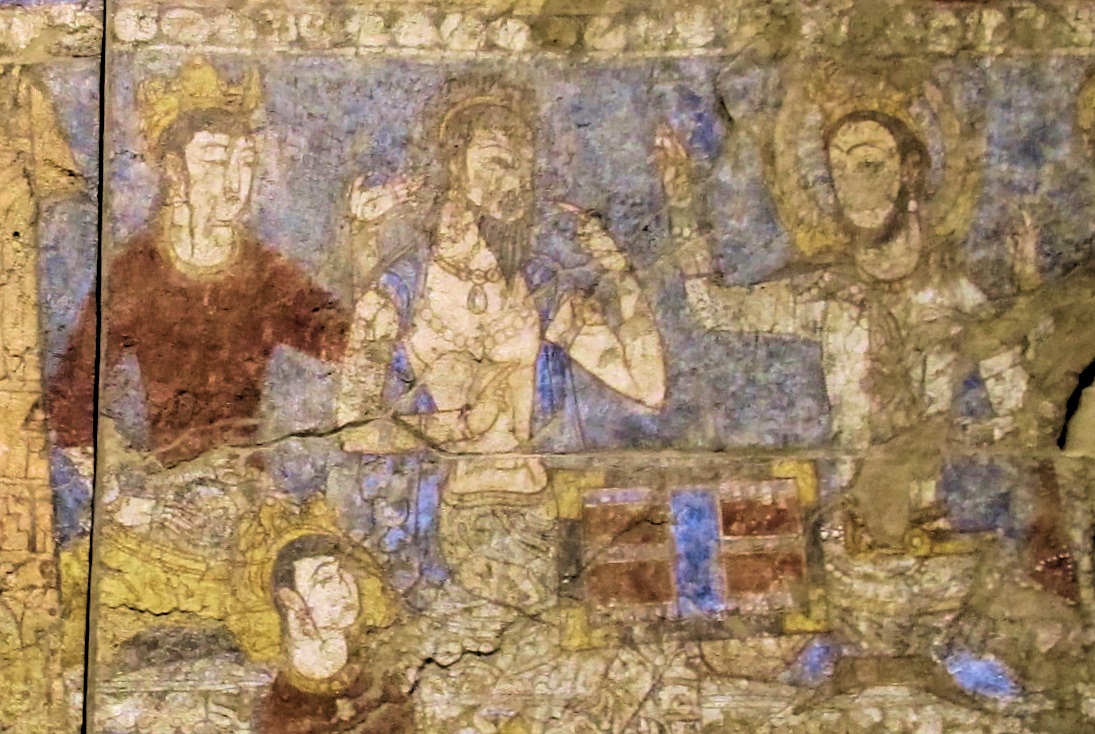
Penjikent, figures with halos, first half of the 8th century. Sector XXIV. Chamber 1. Hermitage Museum

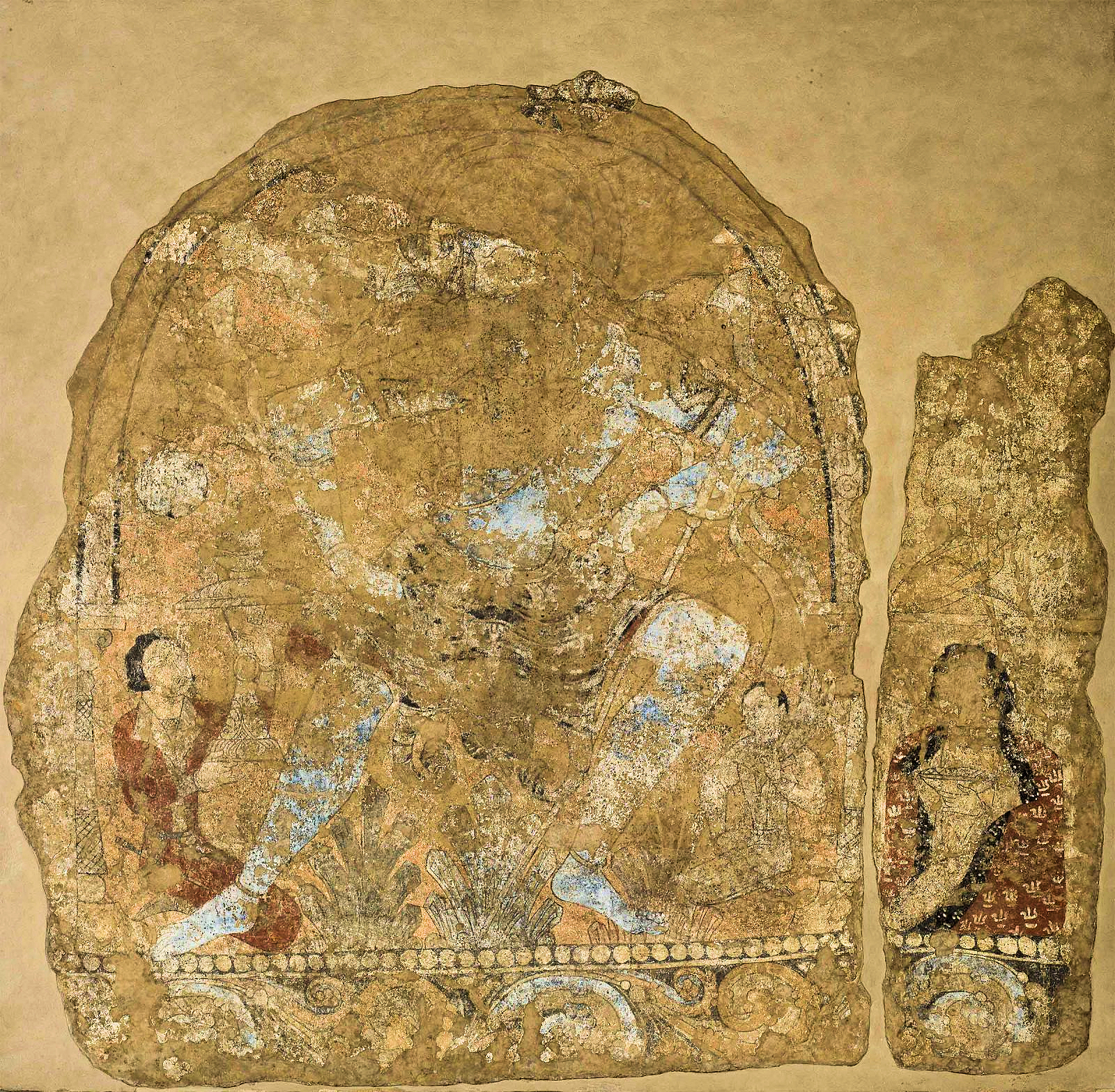
Shiva with Trishula. Penjikent 7th–8th century CE. Hermitage Museum

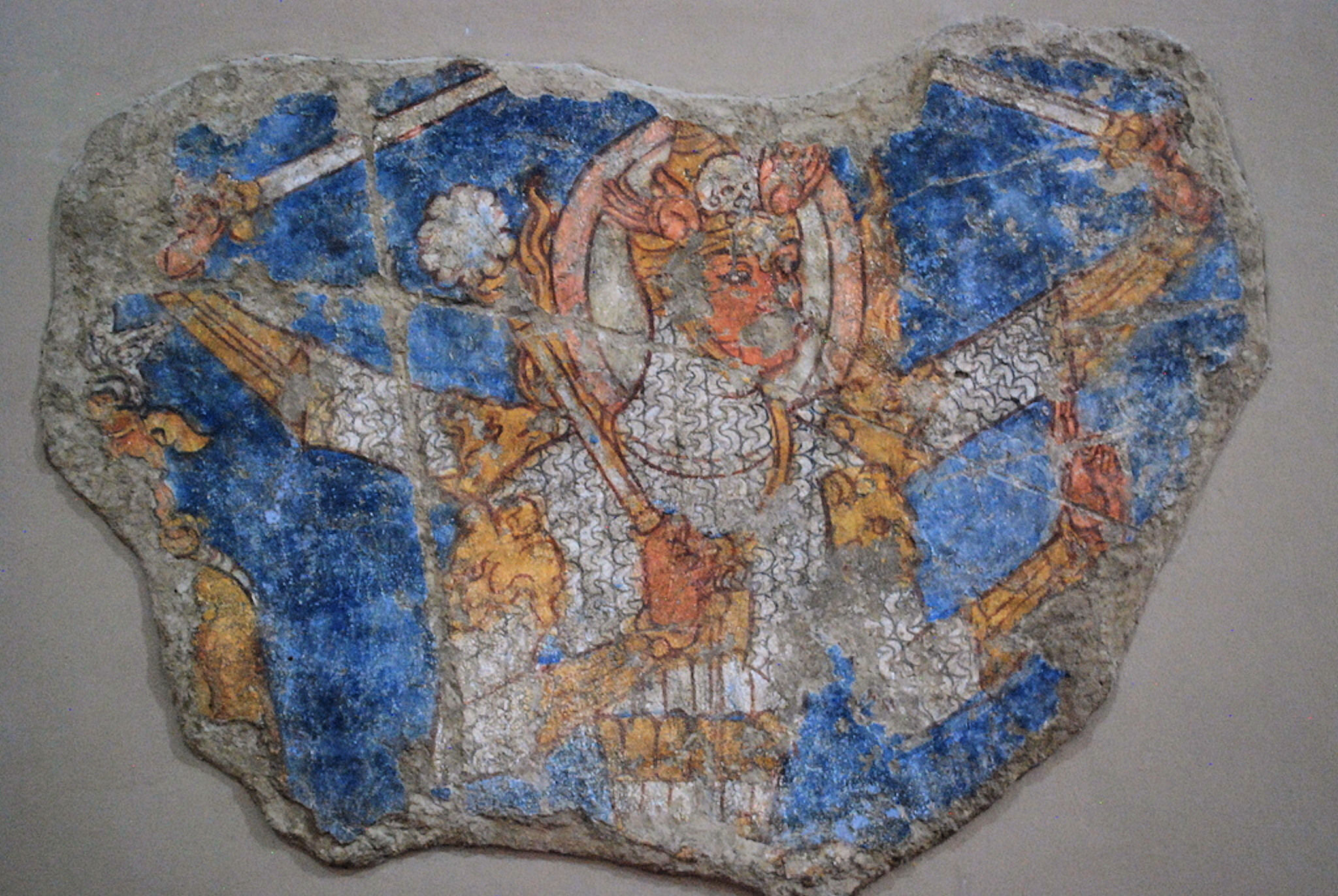
Multi-armed deity in armour: "A King of the Demons". Room 19/ Sector XXVI. 8th century CE.

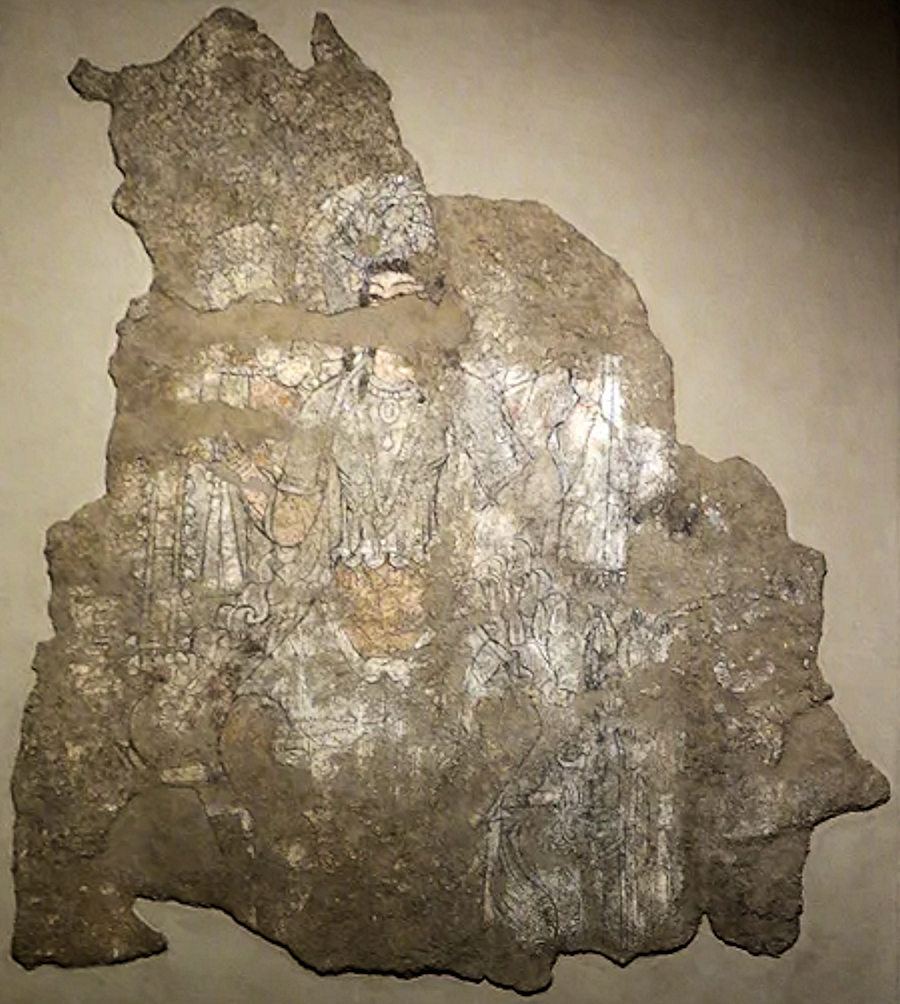
Deity from Temple II, 5th to early 6th century (circa 500). Hermitage Museum.

== Battle scenes ==
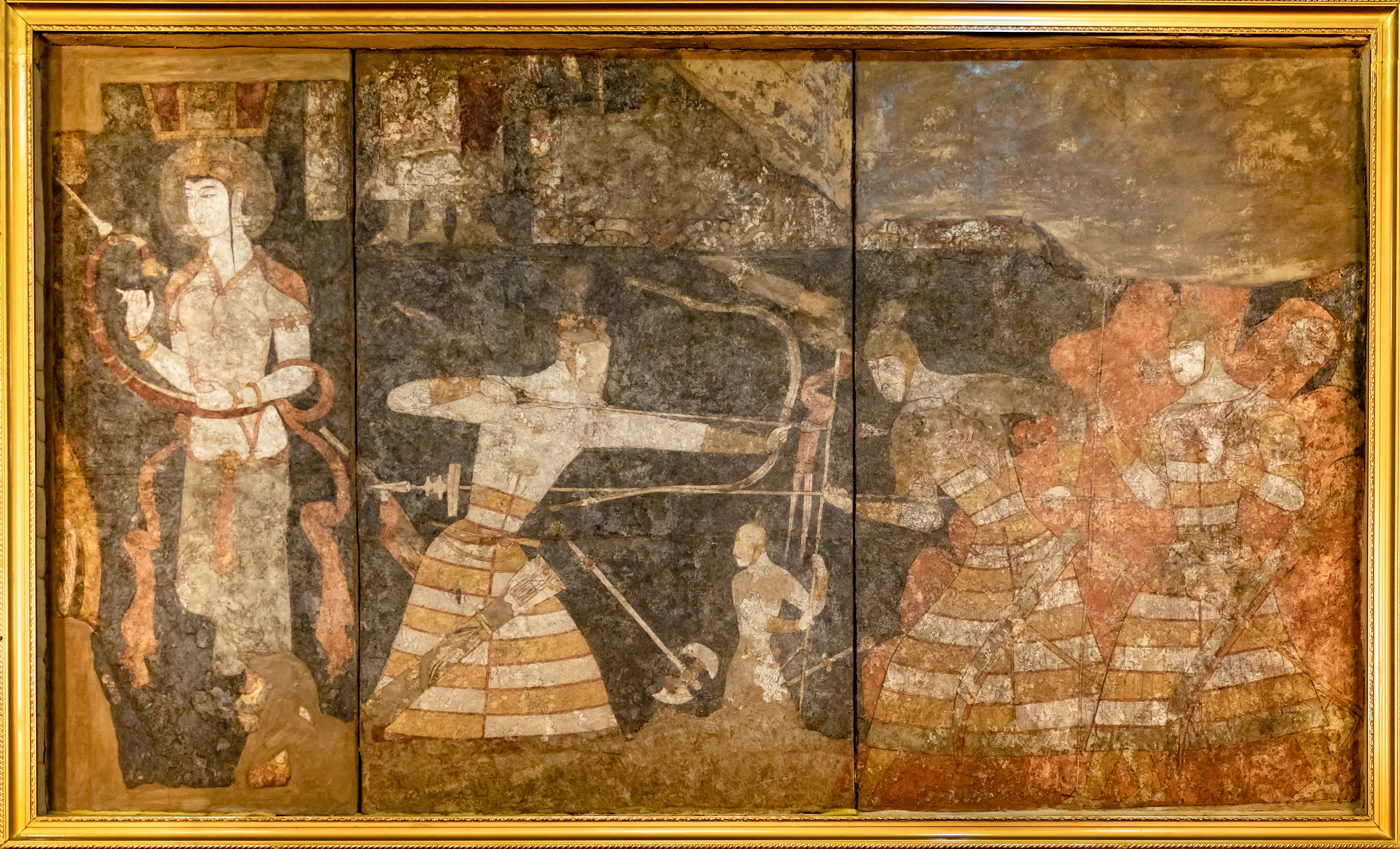
Panjikent mural (6th-7th century CE). National Museum of Antiquities of Tajikistan

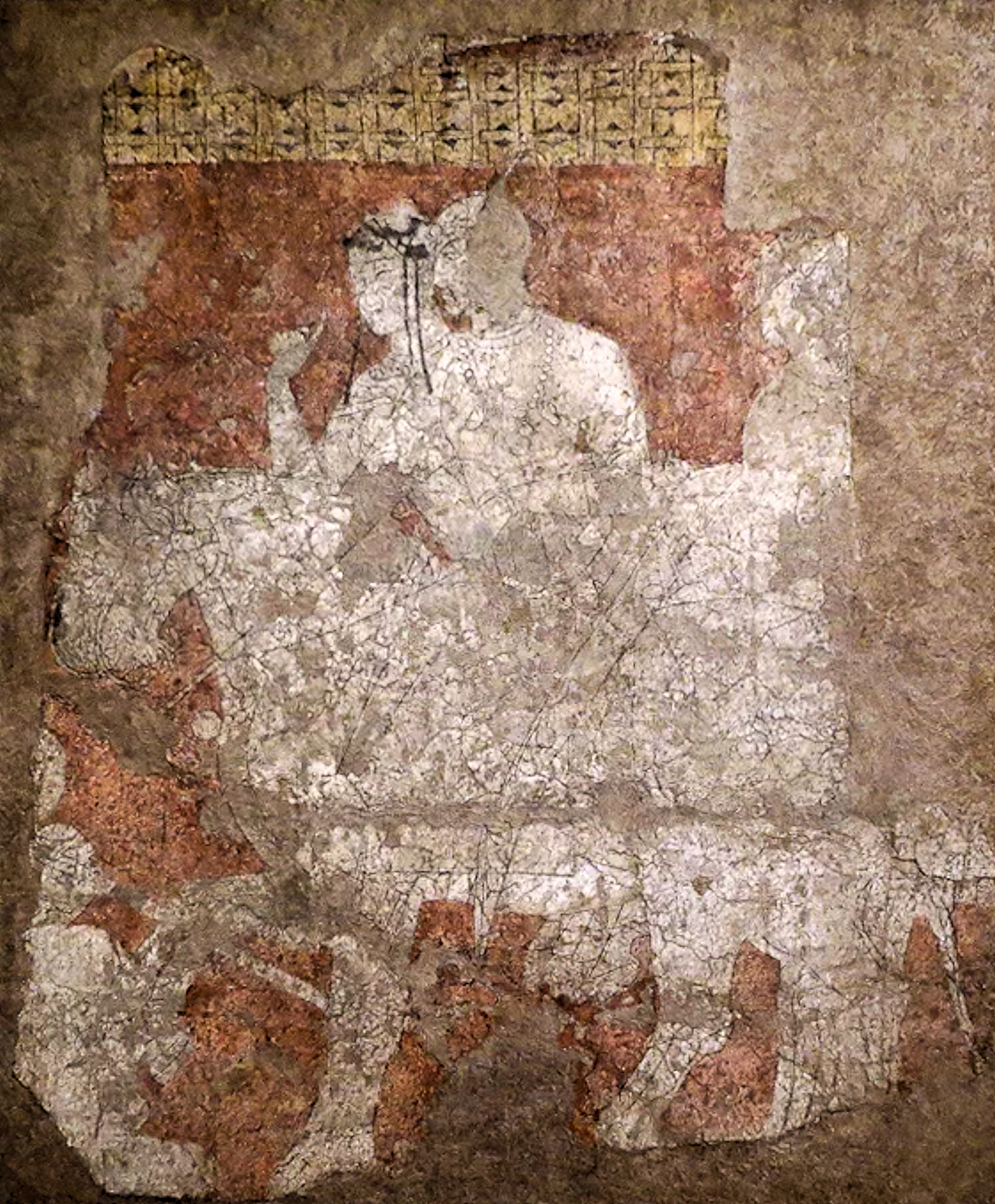
Horse-riding warriors, Penjikent, Hermitage Museum

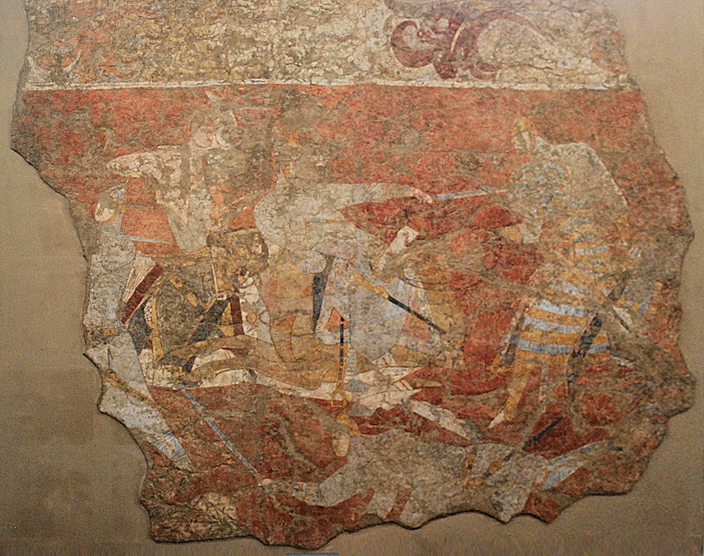
Battle scene

== Female figures ==
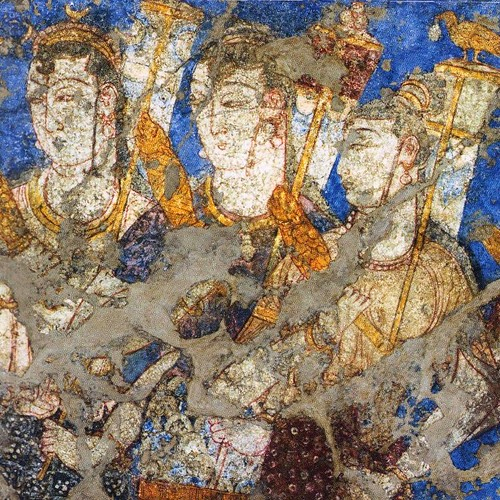
The triple-crescent crown in this Penjikent murals (top left corner), is considered as a late Hephthalite marker. 7th-early 8th century.

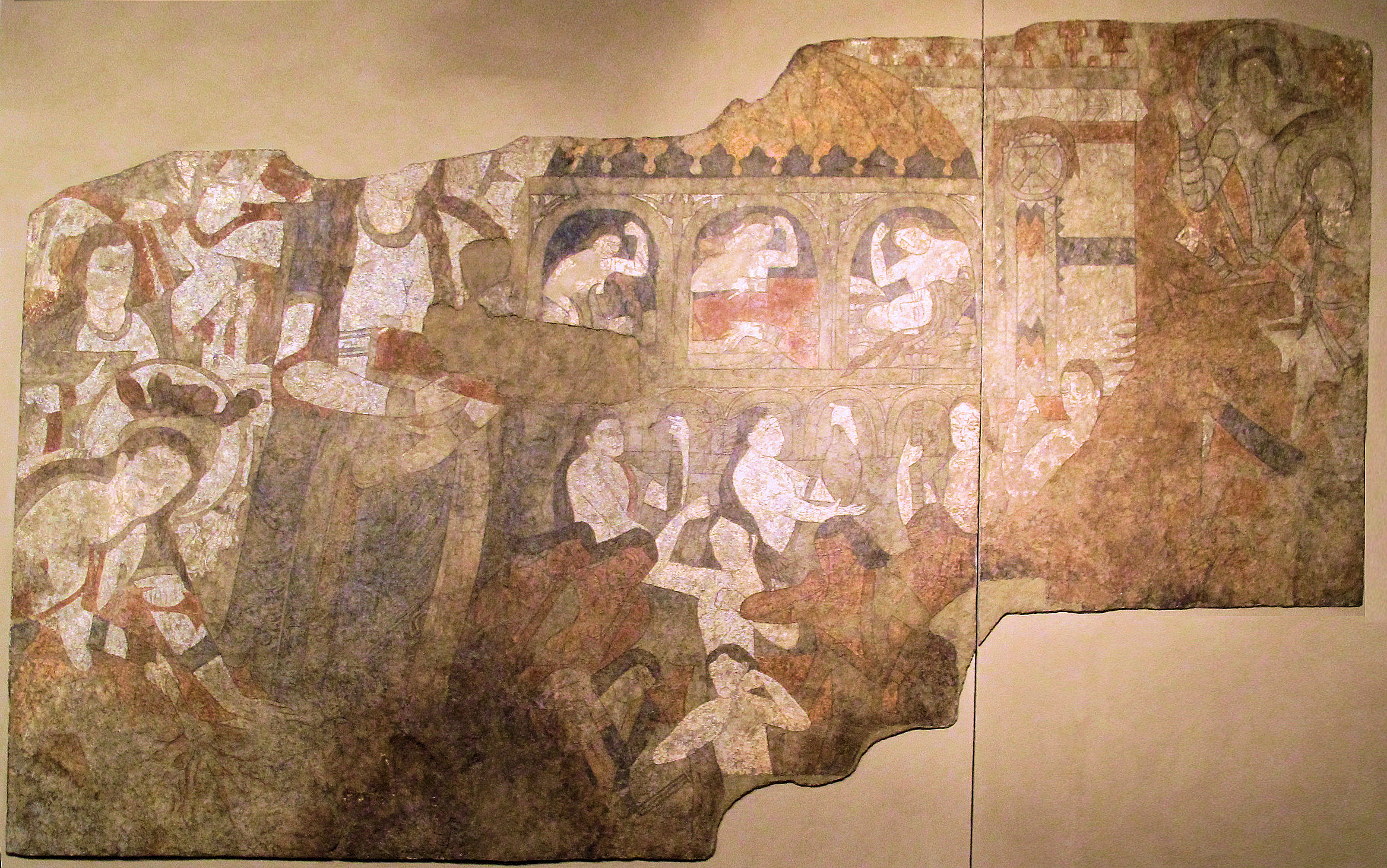
Mourning scene

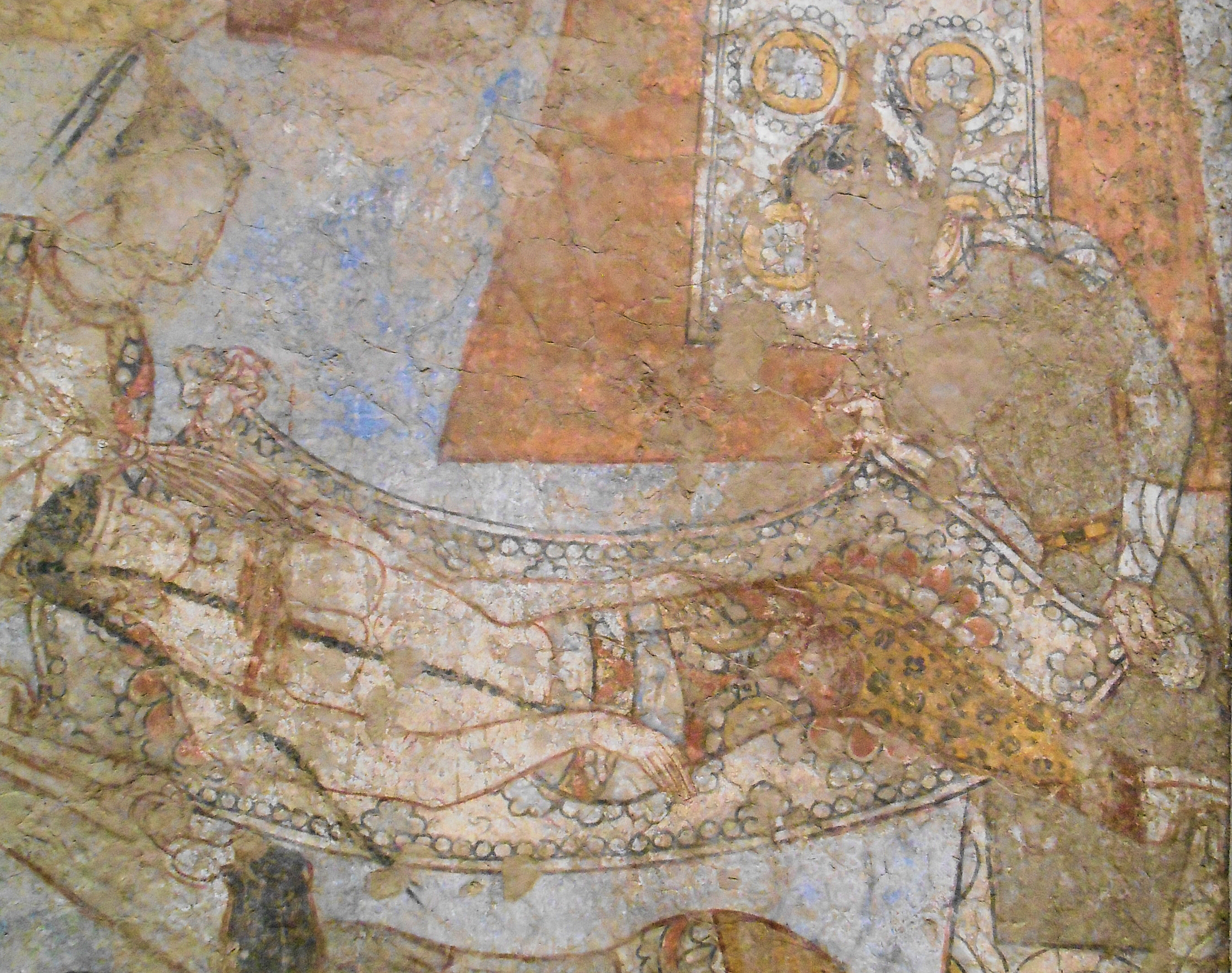
Injured Amazon carried on a stretched by two male attendants.

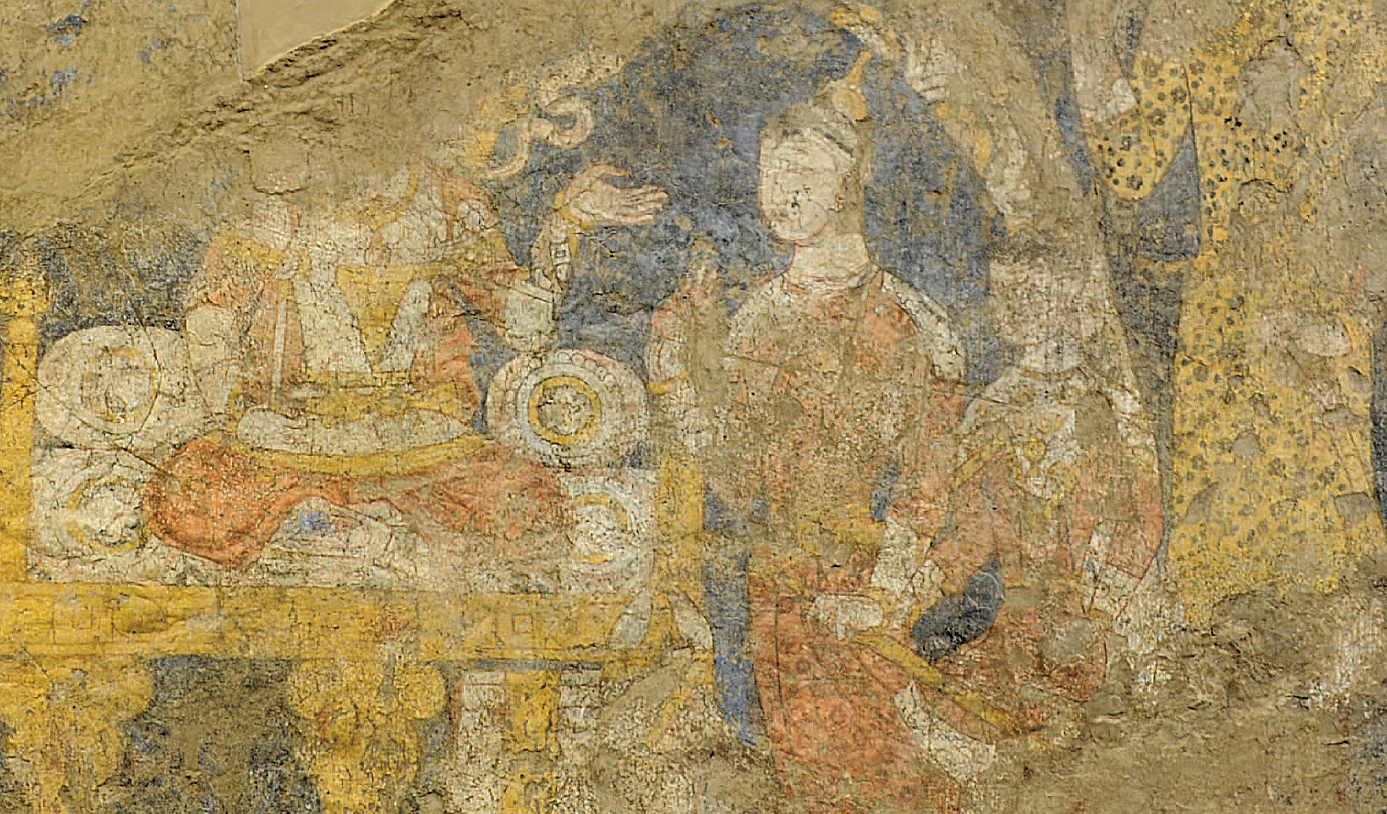
Faramarz and the Princess of Kahila, before King Key Khosrow and Rostam

== Ethnicities ==
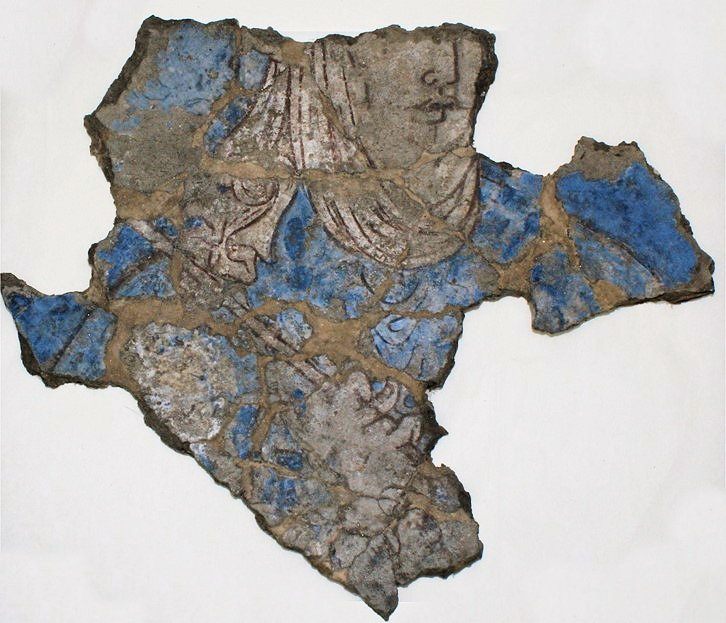
Wealthy Arab, Palace of Devashtich

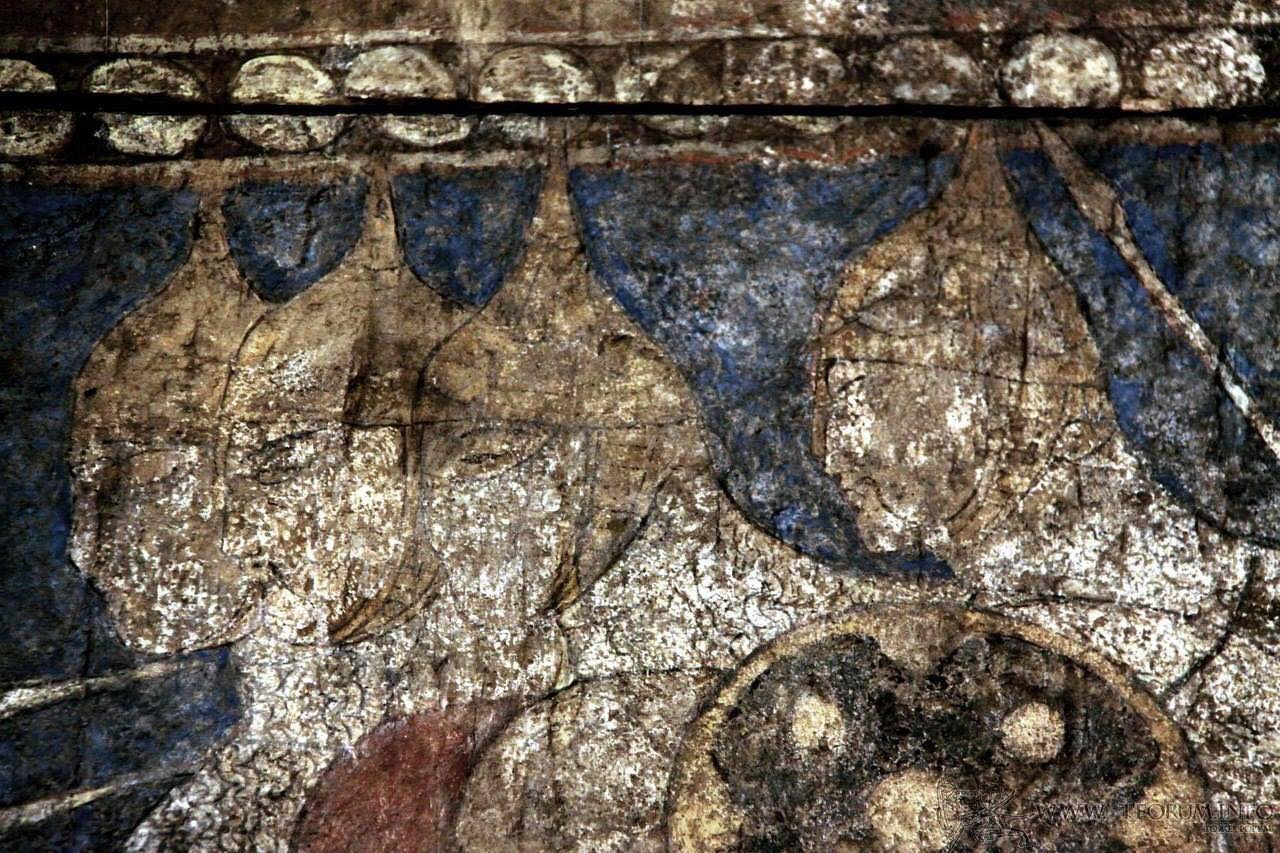
Horsemen with pointed helmet.

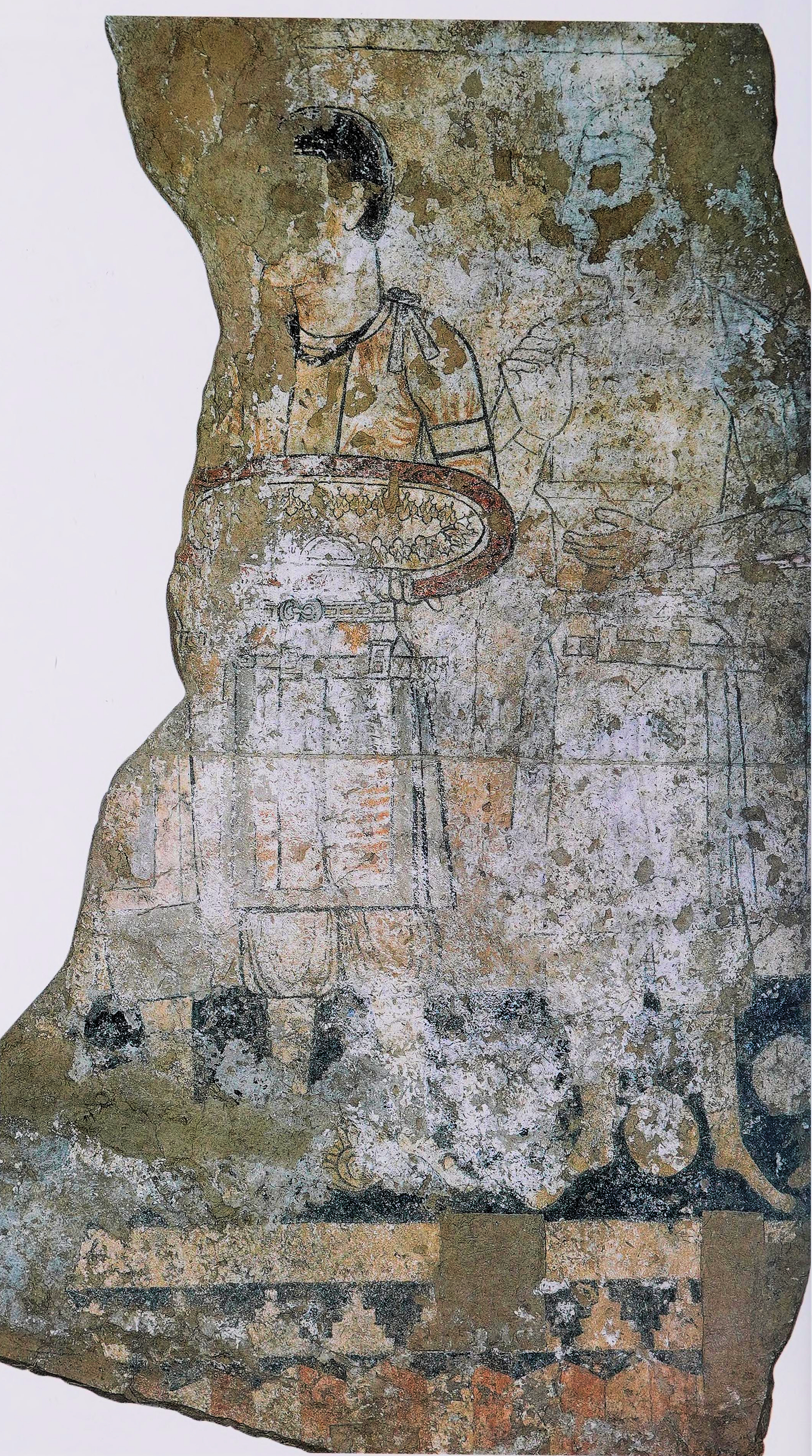
Penjikent donors, Temple II, 5th to early 6th century (circa 500). They are similar to the donors of Kafir-kala.

== See also ==
- Sogdian art
- Afrasiab paintings
- Dilberjin
- Balalyk tepe
