= Hunnic art =

Art produced by the Huns

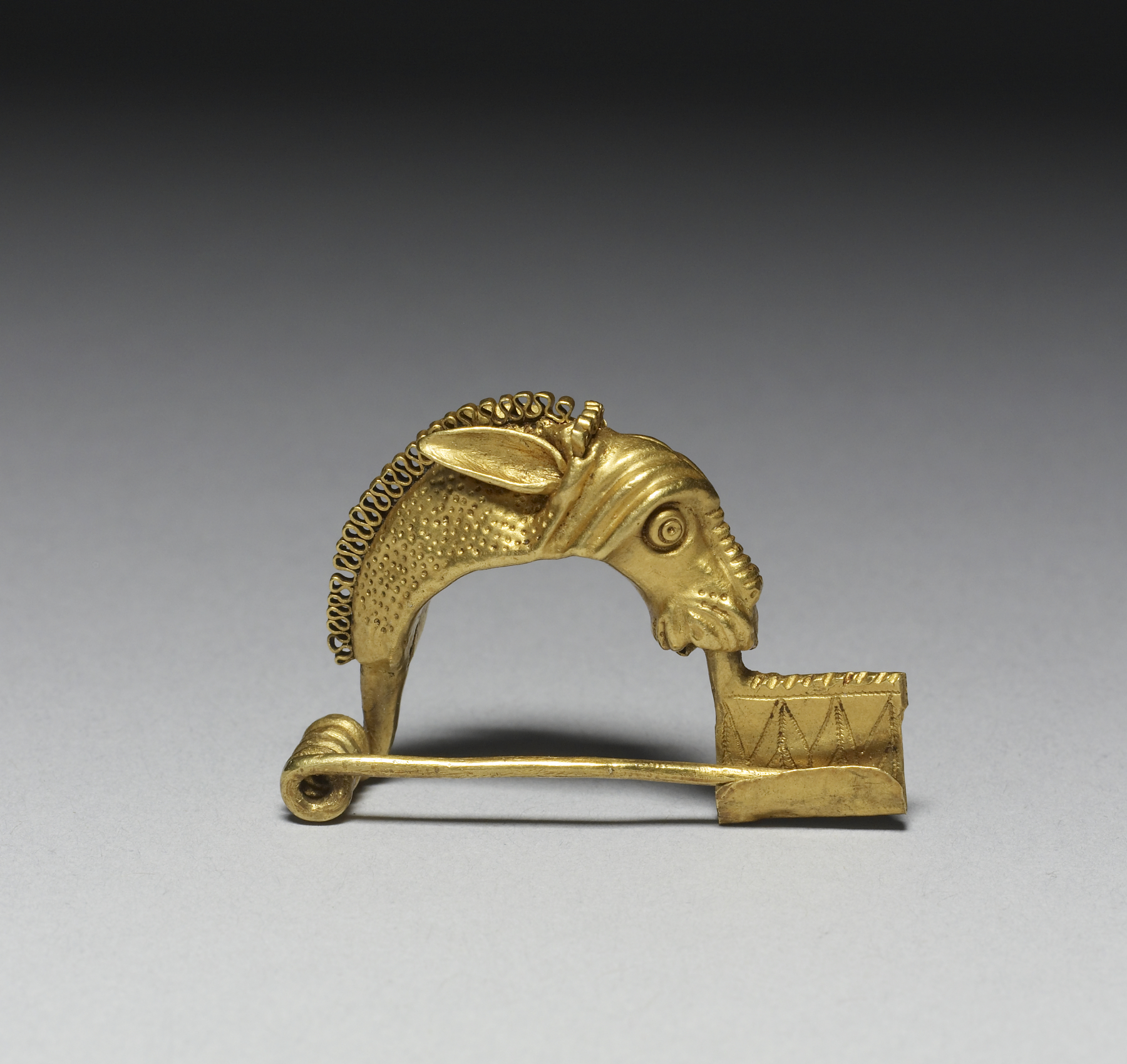
Hunnish horse-head fibula, early 5th century AD

The Huns were a nomadic people during the 4th through 6th centuries. There are two sources for their material culture and art: ancient descriptions and archaeology. The nomadic nature of Hun society means that they have left very little in the archaeological record. Although a great amount of archaeological material has been unearthed since 1945, as of 2005 there were only 200 positively identified Hunnic burials producing Hunnic material culture. It can be difficult to distinguish Hunnic archaeological finds from those of the Sarmatians, as both peoples lived in close proximity and seem to have had very similar material cultures. Kim thus cautions that it is difficult to assign any artifact to the Huns ethnically. Also, given the large numbers of culturally Germanic graves from the heart of Attila's empire, it is possible that the Huns in Europe adopted the material culture of their Germanic subjects. Roman descriptions of the Huns, meanwhile, are often highly biased, stressing their supposed primitiveness.

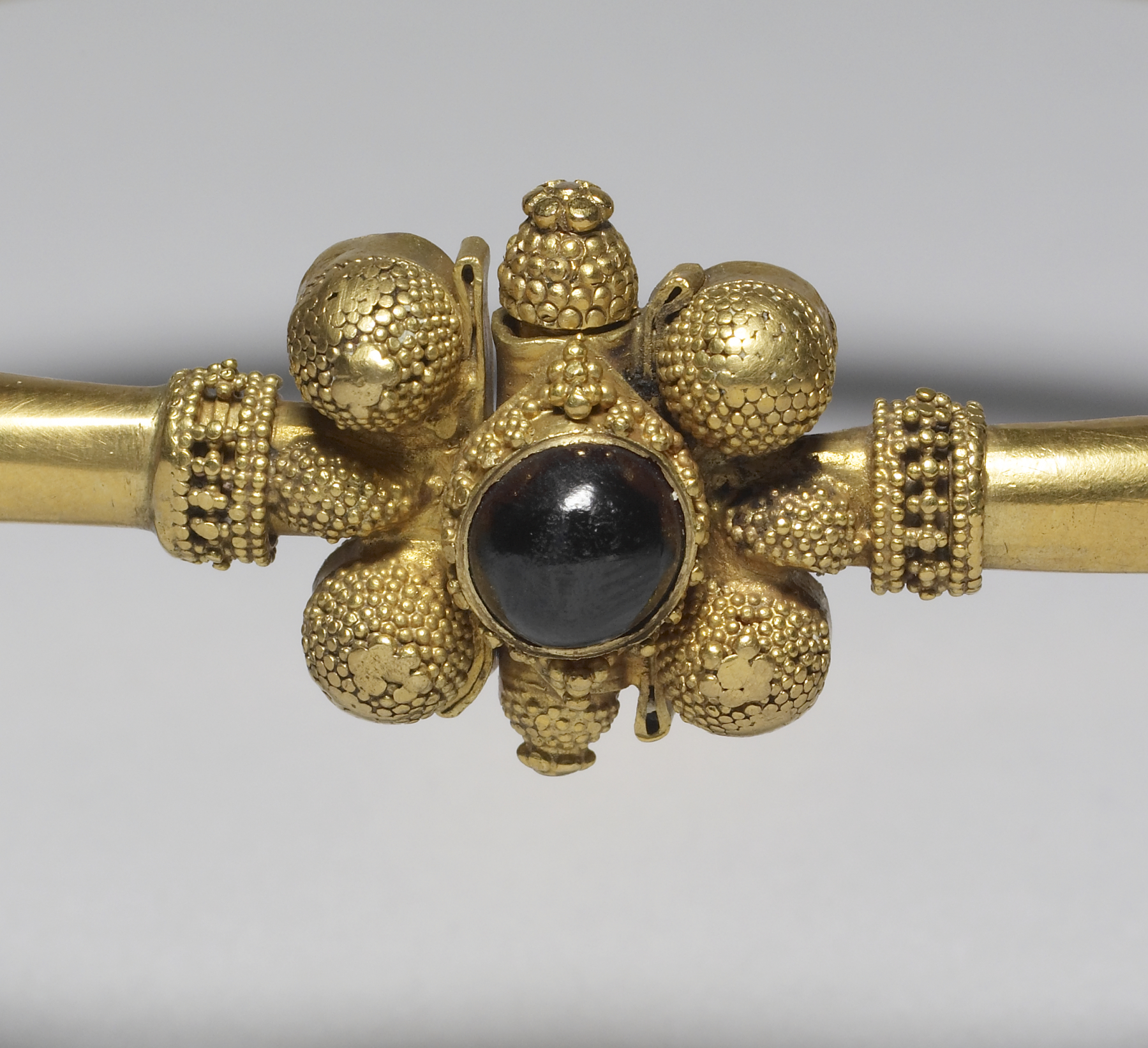
Detail of Hunnish gold and garnet bracelet, 5th century, Walters Art Museum

Jewelry and weapons attributed to the Huns are often decorated in a polychrome, cloisonné style. Archaeologist Joachim Werner argued that the Huns developed a unique "Danubian" style of art that combined Asiatic goldsmithing techniques with the enormous amount of gold given as tribute to the Huns by the Romans; this style then influenced European art. In the 1970s, A. K. Ambroz argued that the polychrome style originated with the Huns; however, more recent archaeological discoveries show that it predates their arrival in Europe. Warwick Ball, moreover, argues that the decorated artifacts of the Hunnish period were probably made by local craftsmen for the Huns rather than by the Huns themselves.

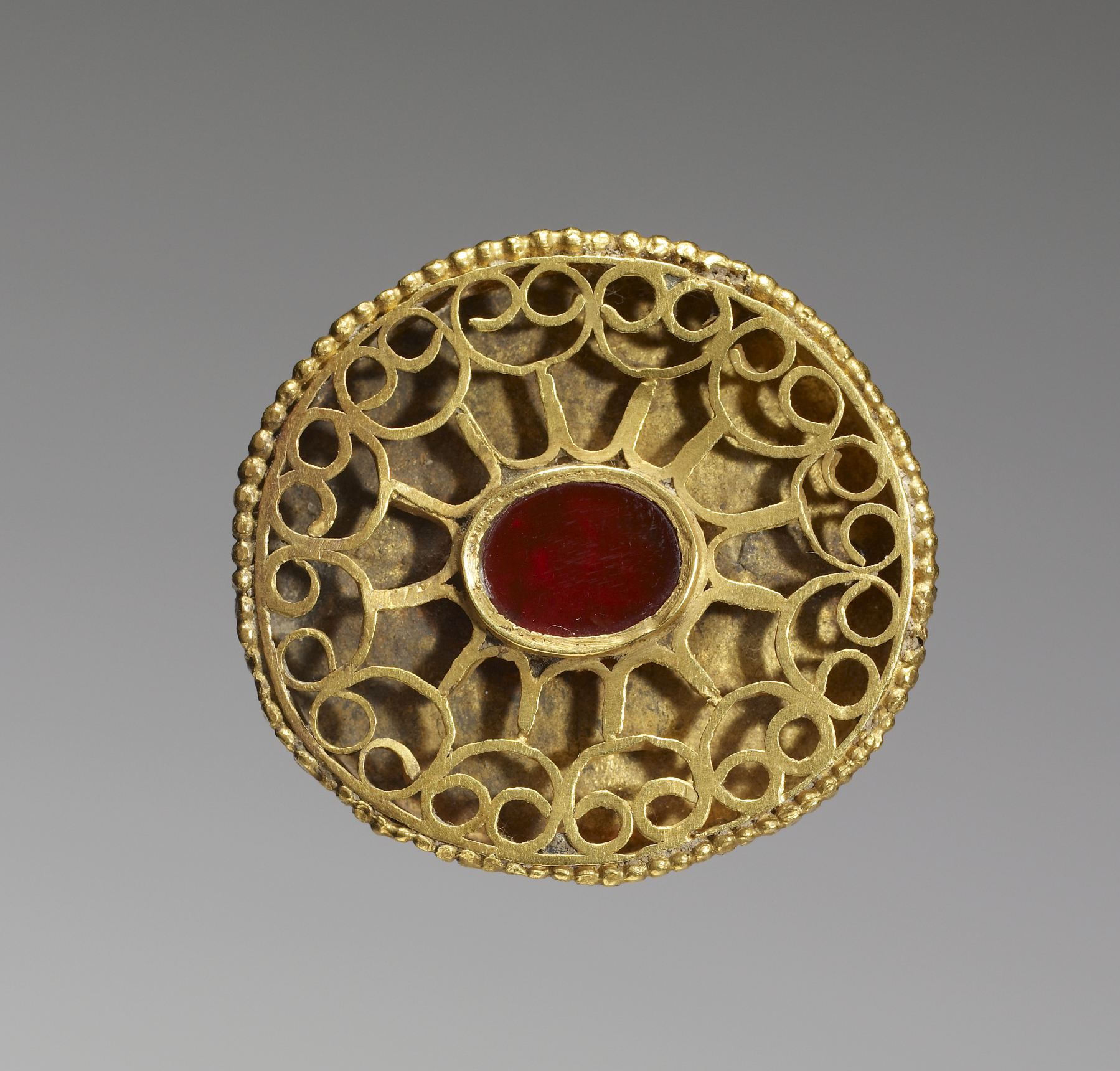
A Hunnish oval openwork fibula set with a carnelian and decorated with a geometric pattern of gold wire, 4th century, Walters Art Museum

Both ancient sources and archaeological finds from graves confirm that the Huns wore elaborately decorated golden or gold-plated diadems. Maenchen-Helfen lists a total of six known Hunnish diadems. Hunnic women seem to have worn necklaces and bracelets of mostly imported beads of various materials as well. They are also known to have possessed small mirrors of an originally Chinese type, which often appear to have been intentionally broken when placed into a grave. Archaeological finds indicate that the Huns wore gold plaques as ornaments on their clothing, as well as imported glass beads.

== See also ==
- Central Asian art
- Deer stone
- East Asian art
- Mongolian art
- Sasanian art
- Sogdian art

== Works cited ==
- Ball, Warwick (2021). The Eurasian Steppe: People, Movement, Ideas. Edinburgh University Press. doi:10.1515/9781474488075. ISBN 9781474488075. S2CID 248348684.
- Bitner-Wróblewska, Anna; Pesch, Alexandra; Przybyła, Marzena J. (2020). "Styles". In Bursche, Aleksander; Hines, John; Zapolska, Anna (eds.). The Migration Period between the Oder and the Vistula. Brill. pp. 225–298. doi:10.1163/9789004422421_011. ISBN 9789004422421. S2CID 216441859.
- Heather, Peter (2005). The fall of the Roman Empire : a new history of Rome and the barbarians. New York: Oxford University Press. pp. 146–167. ISBN 978-0-19-515954-7.
- Kim, Hyun Jin (2015). The Huns. Routledge. ISBN 9781138841758.
- Maenchen-Helfen, Otto J. (1973). Knight, Max (ed.). The World of the Huns: Studies in Their History and Culture. University of California Press. doi:10.1525/9780520310773. ISBN 978-0-520-01596-8.
- Man, John (2005). Attila: The Barbarian who Challenged Rome. New York: St. Martin's Press. ISBN 9780553816587.
- von Rummel, Philipp (2007). Habitus barbarus: Kleidung und Repräsentation spätantiker Eliten im 4. und 5. Jahrhundert. de Gruyter. doi:10.1515/9783110918205.
- Thompson, E. A. (1996). Heather, Peter (ed.). The Huns. Blackwell Publishers. ISBN 978-0-631-15899-8.
