= Anyang funerary bed =

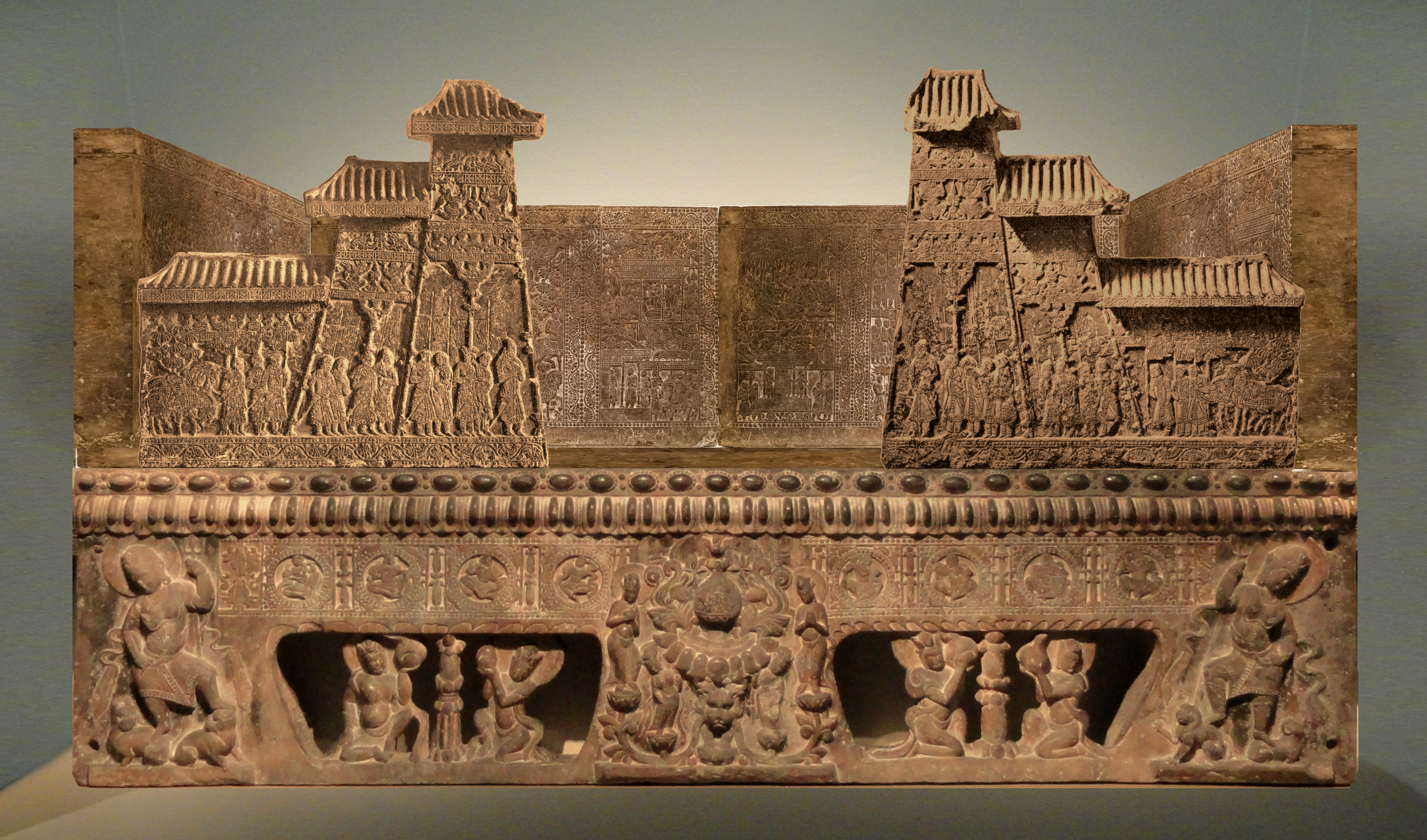
- Anyang funerary bed (reconstitution).
- Created: 550–577 CE (Northern Qi)
- Discovered: Probably Anyang; 36.099°N 114.392°E
- Present location: Parts in the Freer Gallery of Art, Museum of East Asian Art (Cologne), Boston Museum of Fine Arts, Guimet Museum.

Location

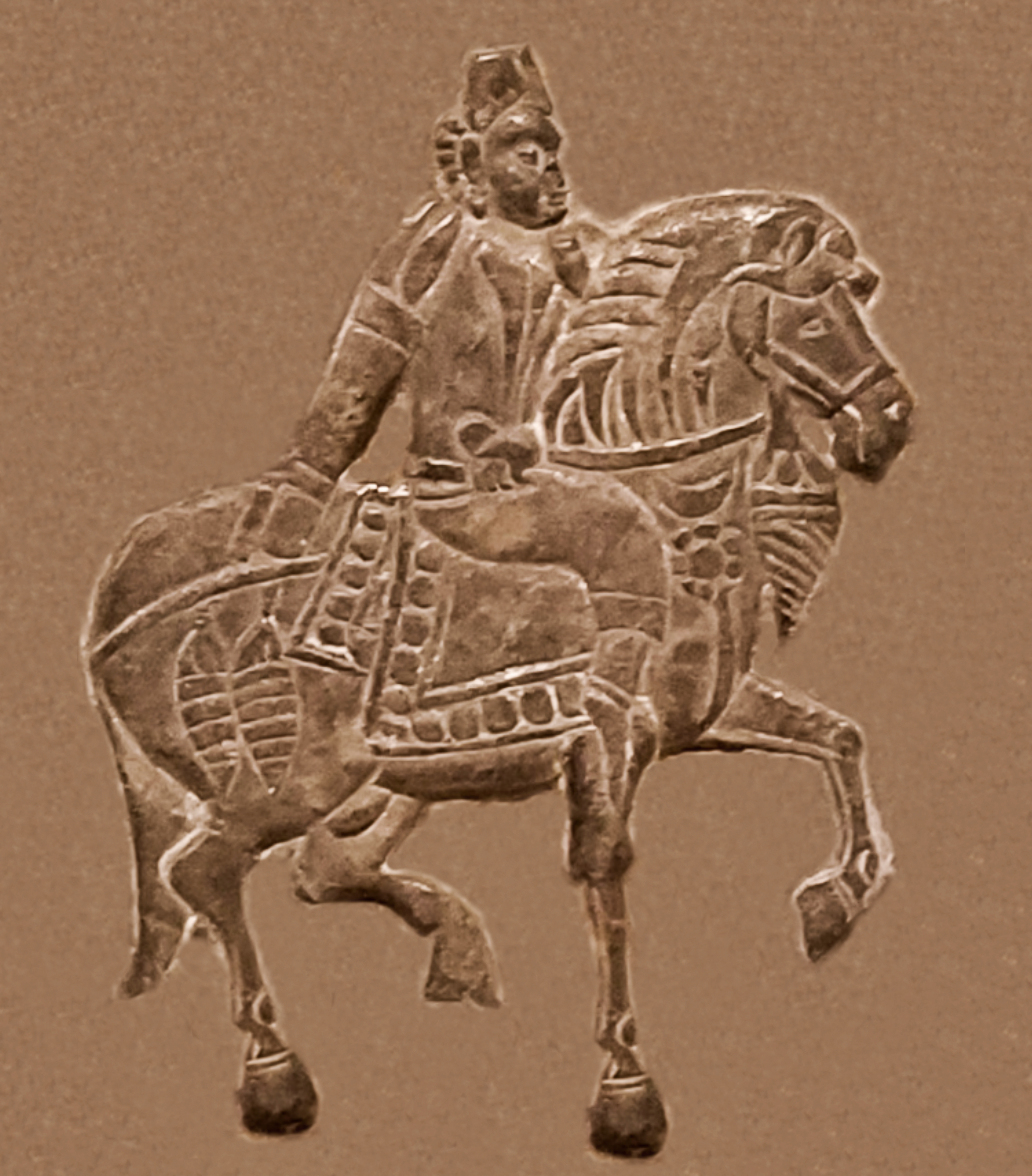
The Prince, presumable owner of the tomb, on horseback. From one of the panels of the Anyang funerary bed.

The Anyang funerary bed (Chinese: 安阳北齐石棺), also known locally as the Bed of Ts'ao Ts'ao (from the Chinese hero Cao Cao), is a Chinese funerary couch belonging to a Sogdian merchant and official active in China in the 6th century CE. The tomb was discovered in 1911, and the components of the funerary bed were dispersed among various museums in the world after being offered on the art market. It is thought the funerary bed was excavated in Anyang (ancient Zhangdefu), capital of the Northern Qi dynasty. It is stylically dated to the Northern Qi dynasty (550–577 CE).

== The tomb ==
There are eight known components of this funerary monument: a dais and two cornices with notched ends, now in the Freer Gallery of Art, a pair of gates, now in the Museum of East Asian Art (Cologne), two rectangular slab in the Boston Museum of Fine Arts, and one slab in the Guimet Museum in Paris.

The funerary bed is important to Sogdian art and culture, as it is decorated with musicians in the typical Sogdian attire and with a Buddhist scene including deities. The ensemble of Sogdian musicians includes two lute players, a flutist, two drummers and a cymbal player, as well as two dancers. Two stretchers once attached to the bed showed what the Chinese called a huxuan wu (胡旋舞), i.e. "Sogdian Whirl dance", which was enormously popular in China, and appears on many Chinese tombs. Tang sources confirm the dance's popularity. It was performed at court by the Tang Chinese emperor Xuanzong and his favorite concubine.

Gustina Scaglia was the first to recognize in 1958 that the pieces scattered in several museums belonged to a single funerary couch made for a member of the Sogdian community in China.

The owner and exact history of the owner of the tomb remain unknown, as the epitaph has been lost.

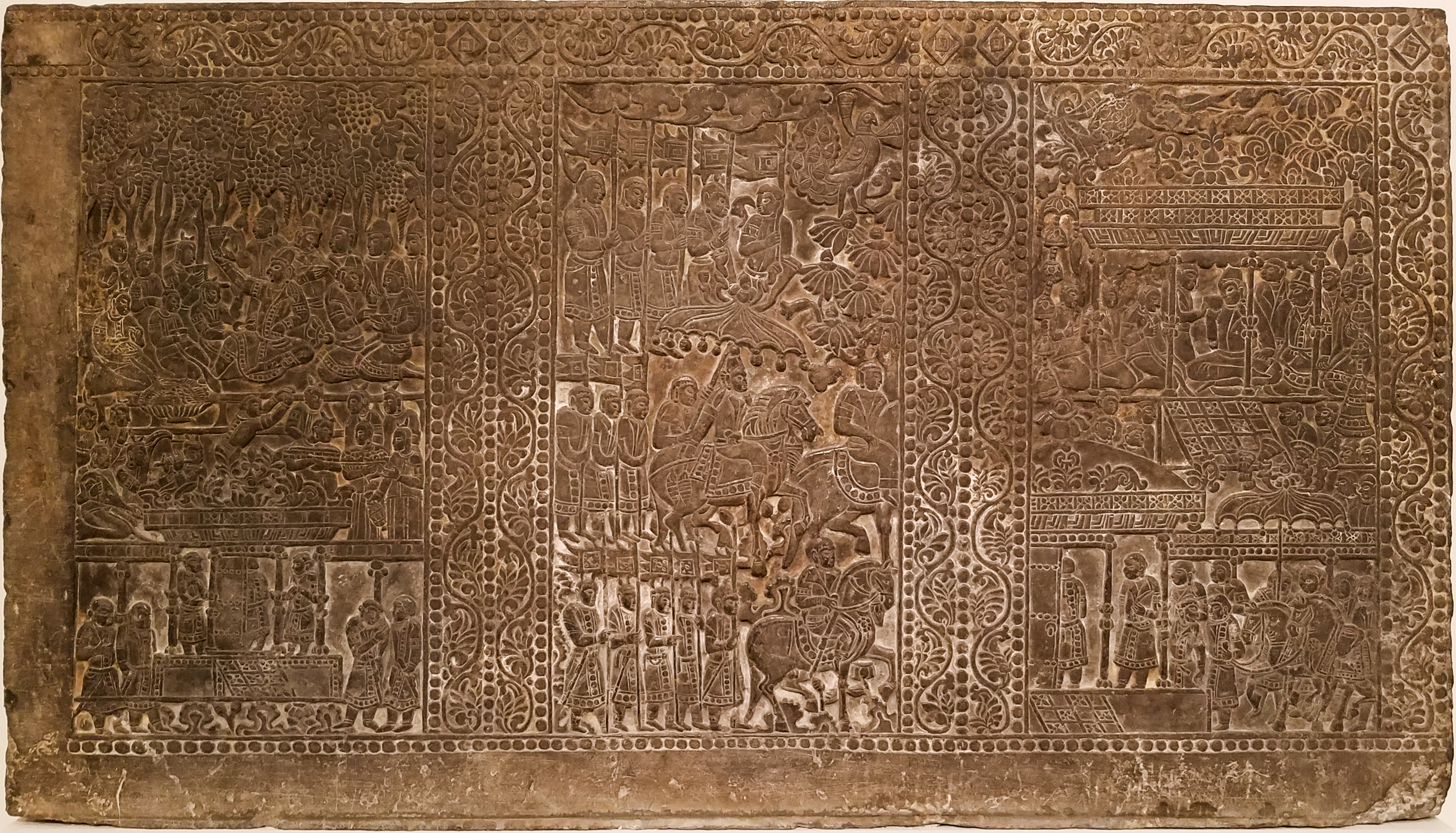
Decorative slab originally forming a part of the funerary bed. Boston Museum of Fine Arts.

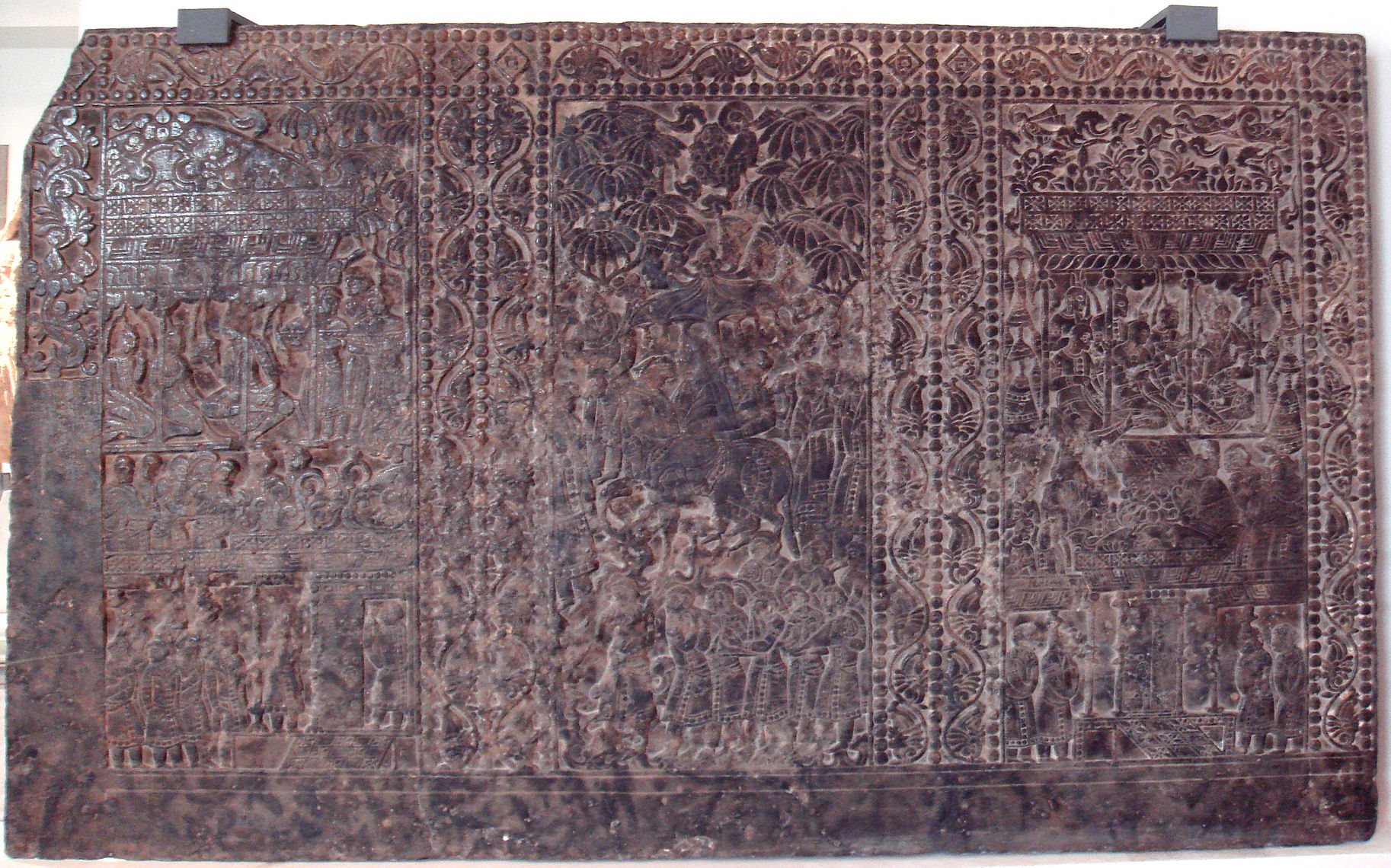
Rectangular slab, Guimet Museum.

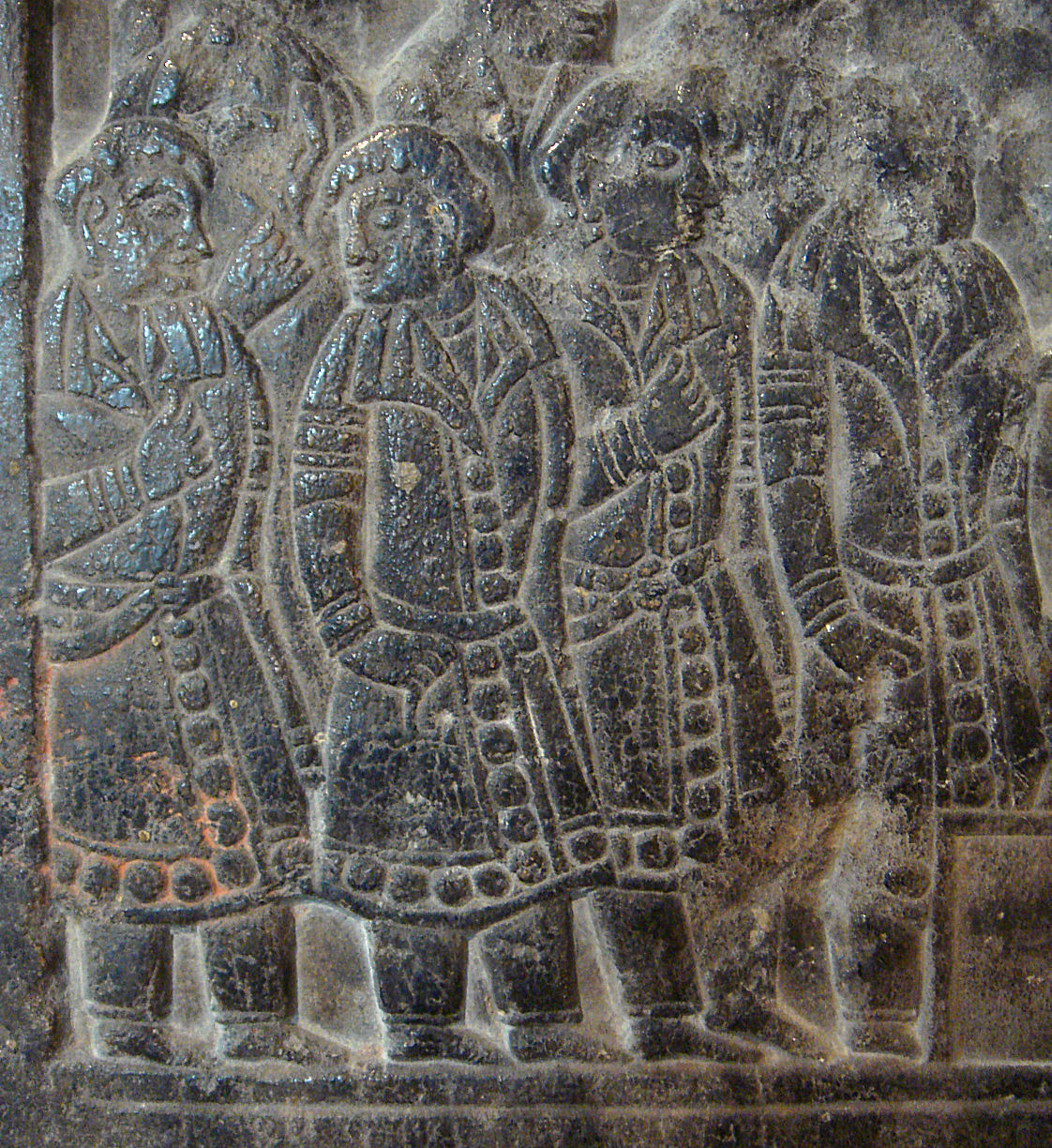
Sogdian New Year Festival, Northern Qi, Guimet Museum.

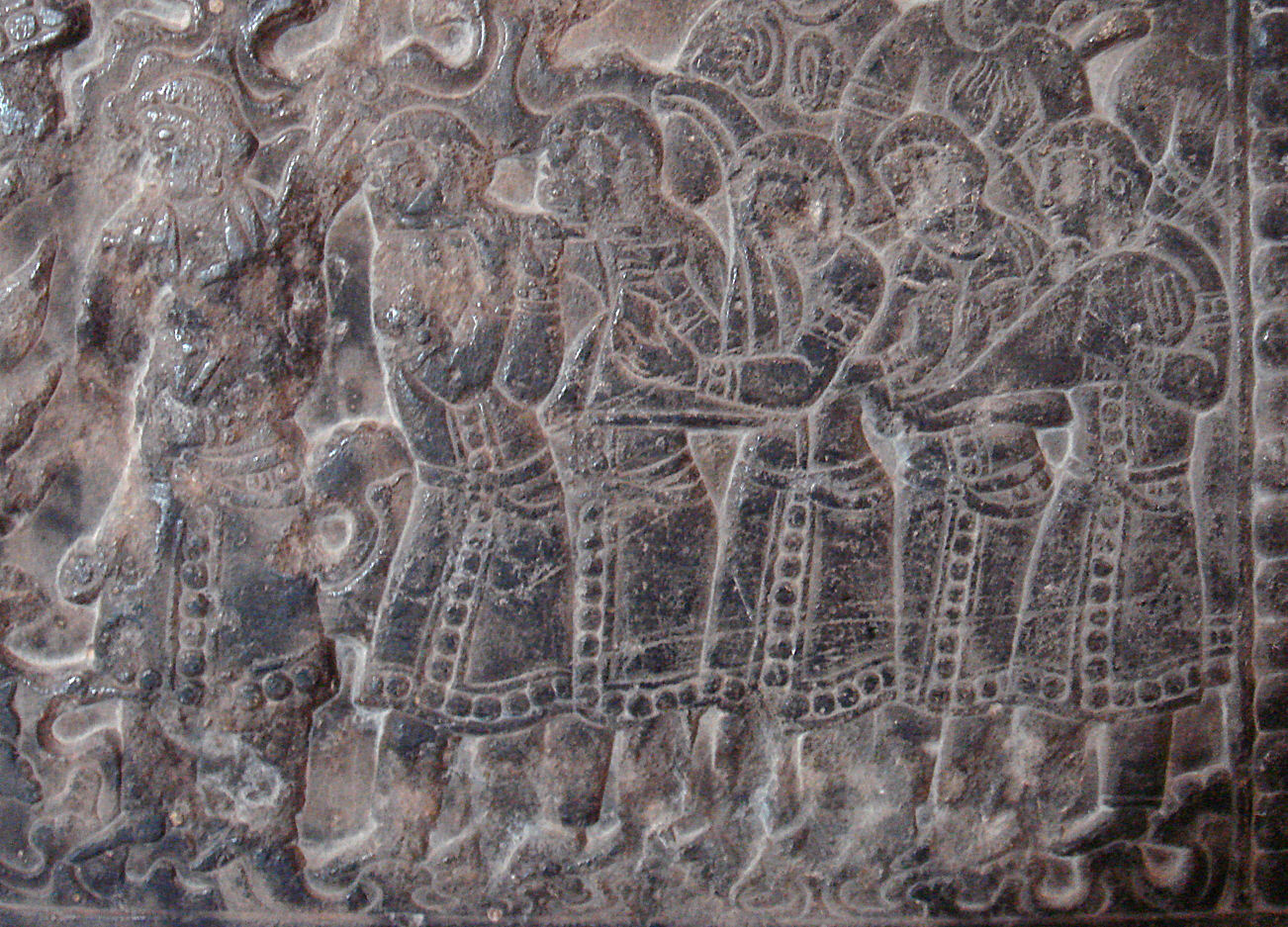
Sogdian musicians from the funerary couch, Northern Qi, Guimet Museum.

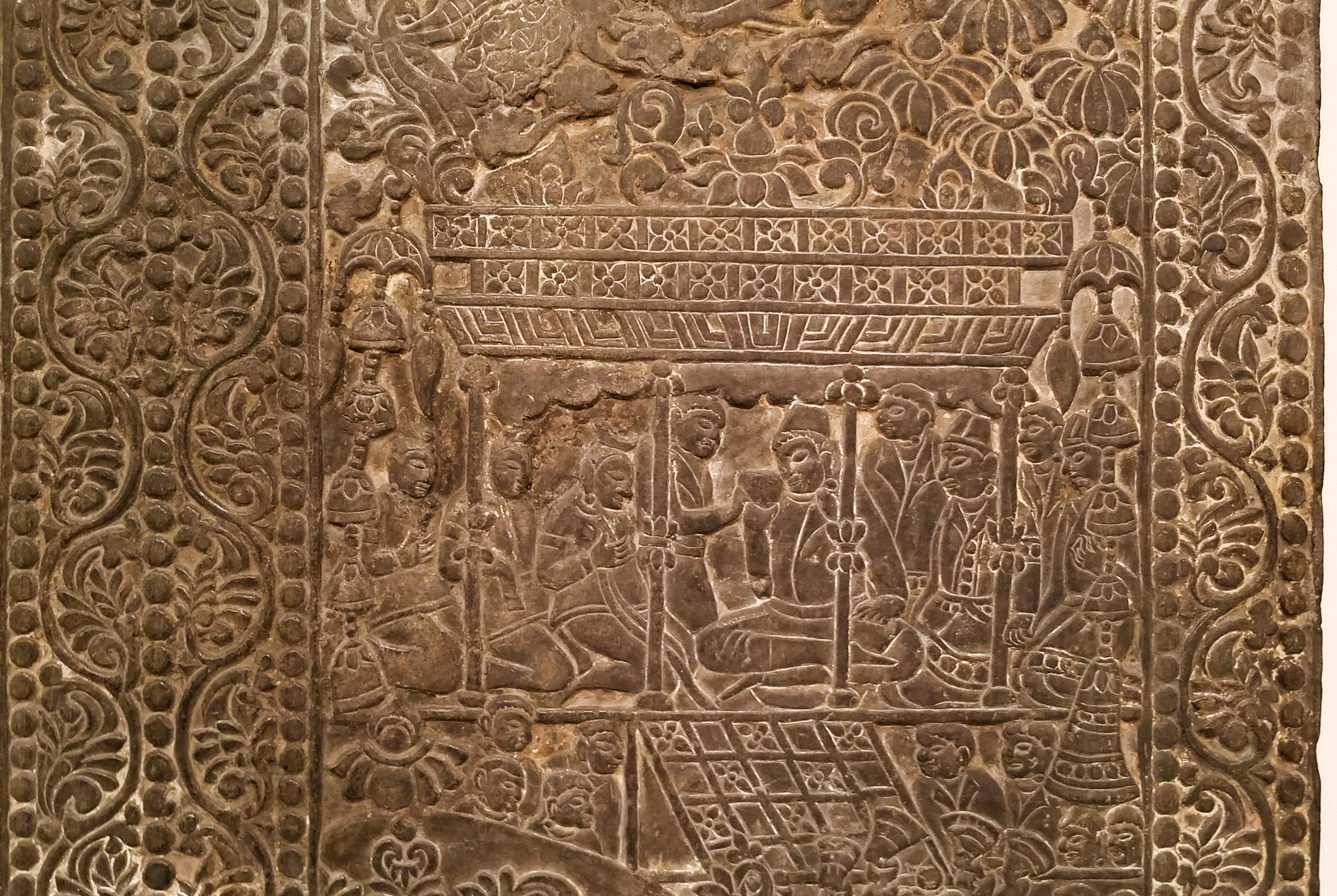
Party detail, Boston Museum of Fine Arts.

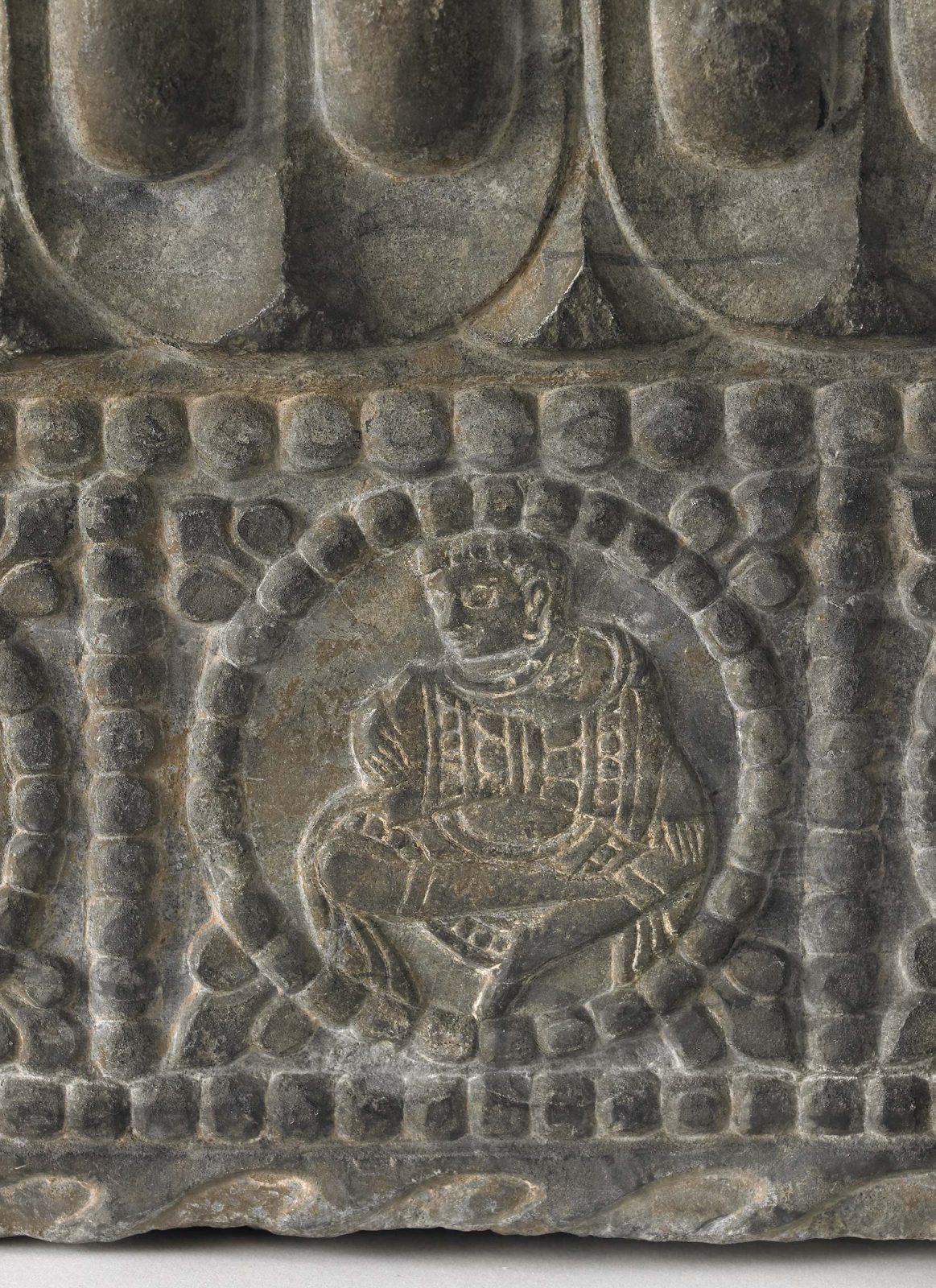
Detail of a musician, Freer Gallery of Art.

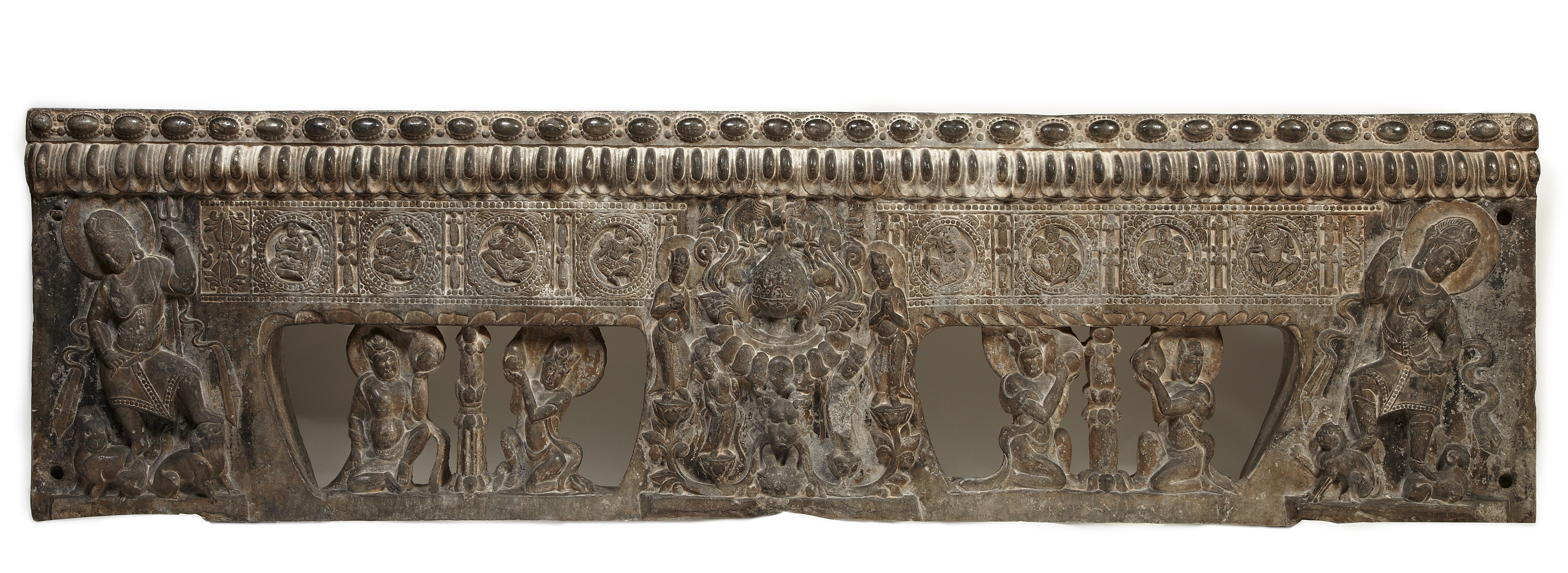
Base of the funerary bed, Freer Gallery of Art.

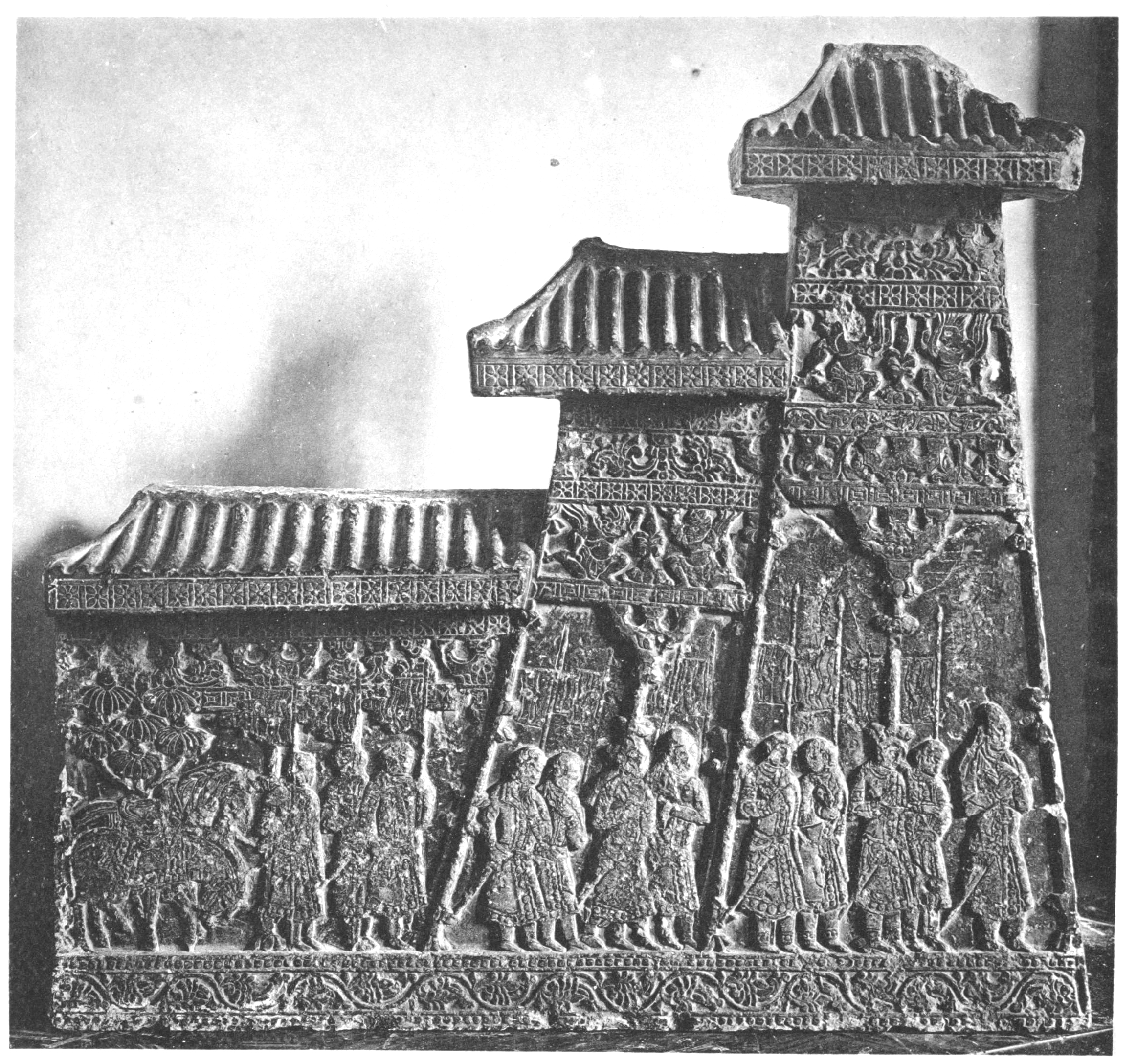
Left gate, Museum of East Asian Art (Cologne)

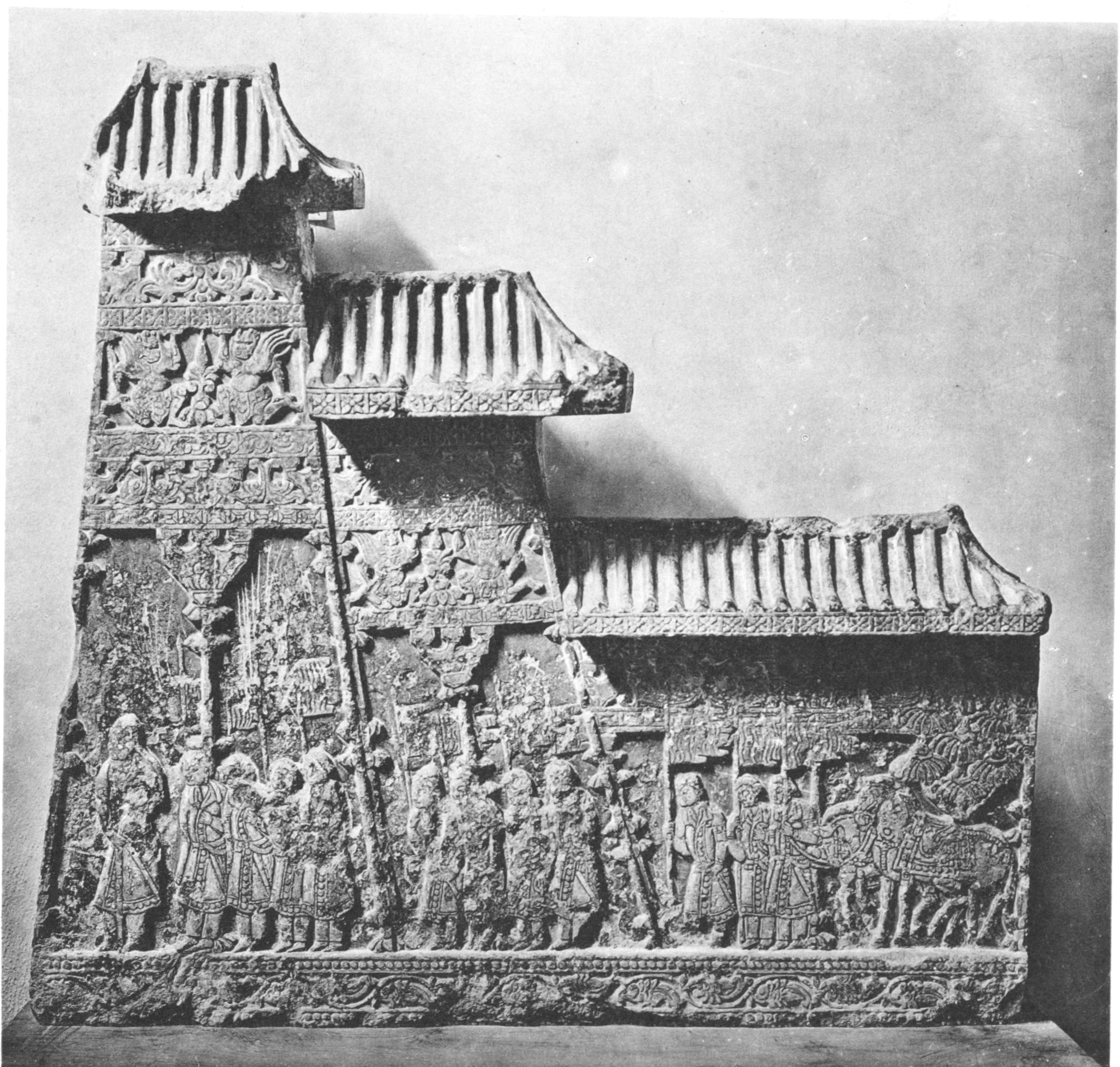
Right gate, Museum of East Asian Art (Cologne)

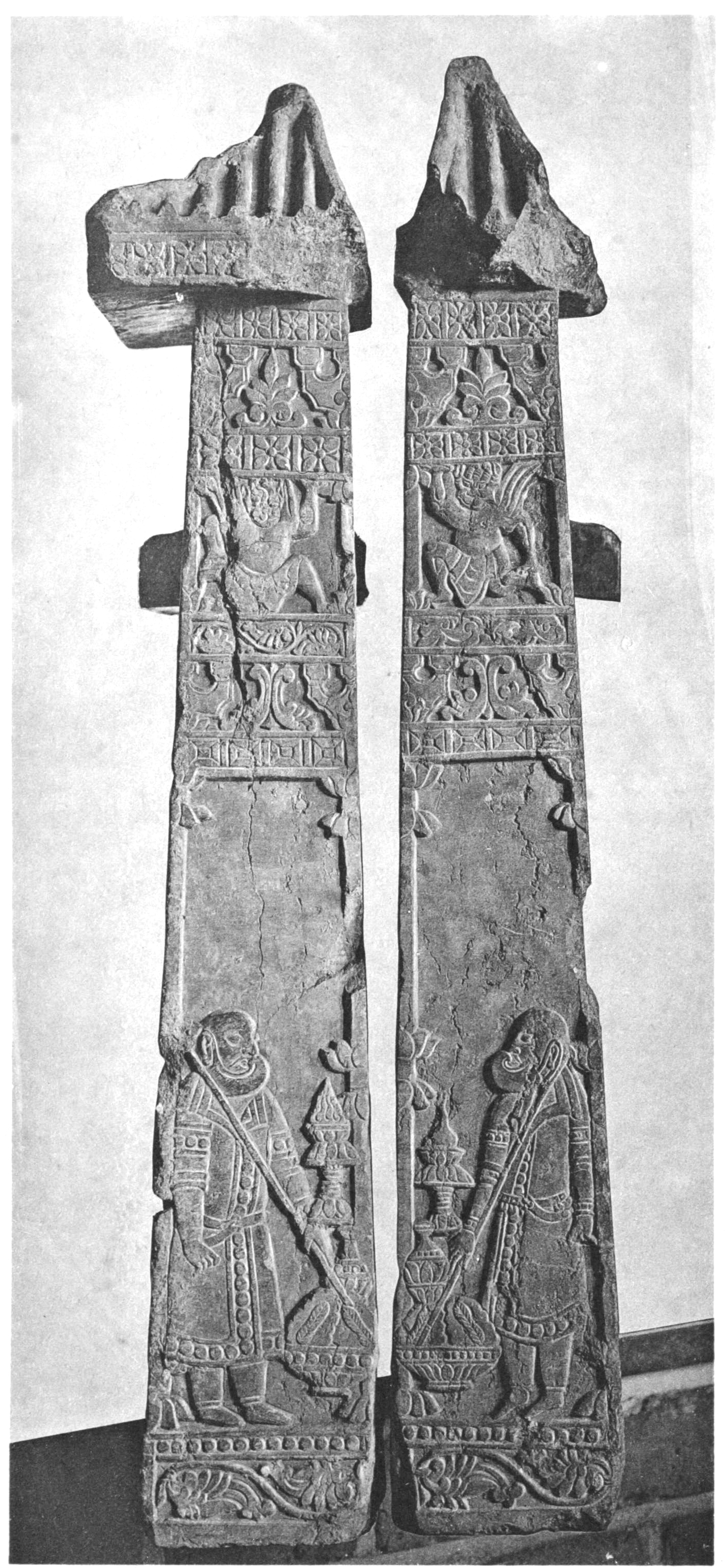
Gate posts, Museum of East Asian Art (Cologne)

== Chinese stone funerary beds ==
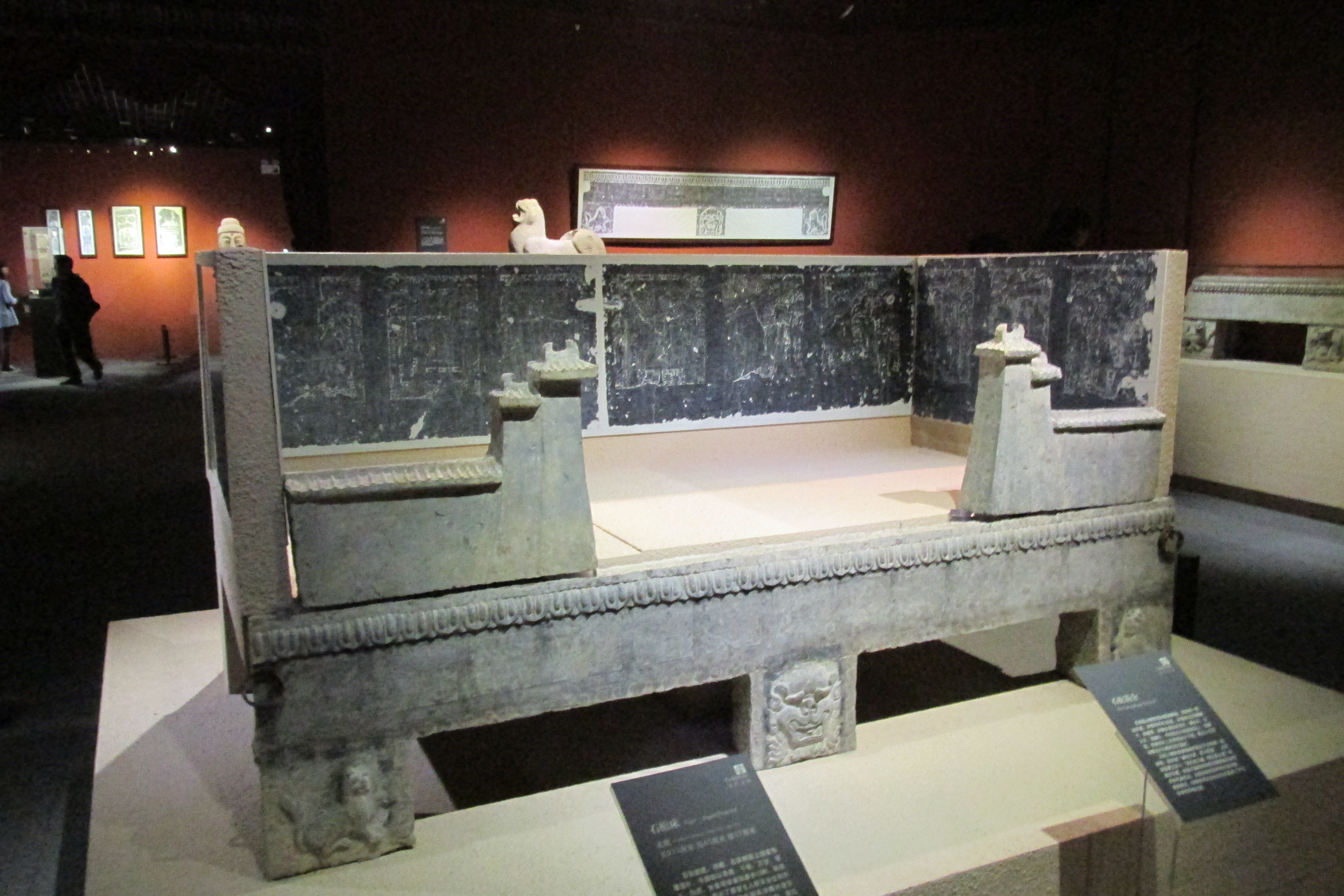
Tiger-shaped stone bed. Northern Wei (386-534 CE). Shenzhen Museum.

Chinese stone funerary beds of similar shape were a standard feature of the period in northern China since the 5th century CE, but were most probably an adaptation from the Western regions, as the earliest example of funerary stone beds can be found in 3rd and 4th century Kucha, and Chinese stone beds were often associated with foreign ethnicity (Xianbei, Tuyuhun...) and possibly Buddhism or Zoroastrianism. Still, Sogdian tombs in China are among the most lavish of the period in this country, and are only inferior to Imperial tombs, suggesting that the Sogdian Sabao were among the wealthiest members of the population.

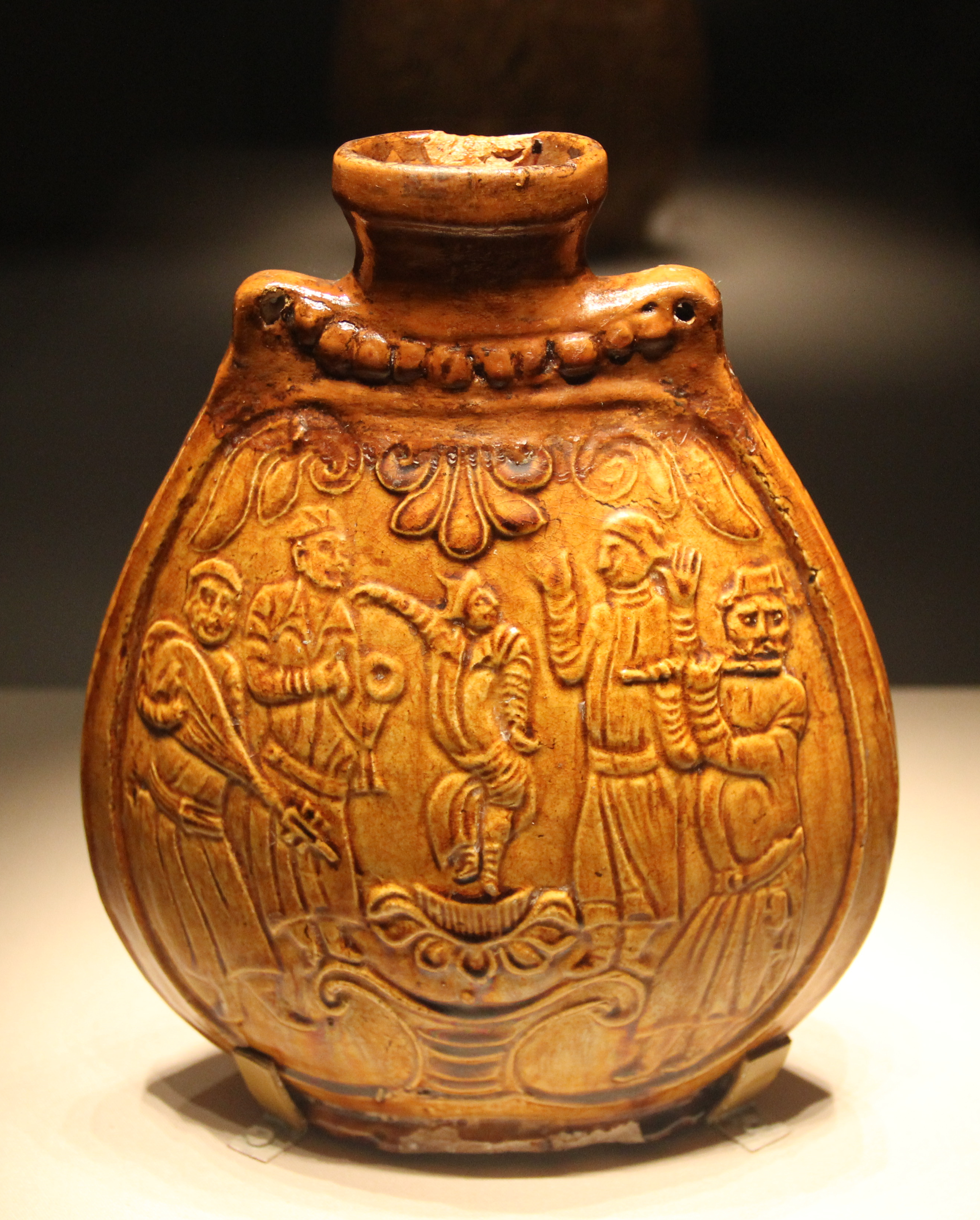
Northern Qi jar with Central Asian (probably Sogdian) dancer and musicians, from a tomb at Anyang, 575 CE.

Sogdian stone funerary beds disappear during the subsequent Tang dynasty period, even though Sogdian influence was probably even more significant in China at that time, possibly due to Imperial restrictions regarding funerary practices.

Other tombs from Anyang are known to have contained objects with Central Asian influence, such as a jar decorated with Central Asian dancer and musicians, from the tomb of a Northern Qi official at Anyang, and dated to 575 CE.

== See also ==
- Tomb of Li Dan

== Sources ==
- Li, Yusheng (2016). "STUDY OF TOMBS OF HU PEOPLE IN LATE 6TH CENTURY NORTHERN CHINA". Newsletter di Archeologia CISA. 7.
- Lerner, Judith A. (2005). "ASPECTS OF ASSIMILATION: THE FUNERARY PRACTICES AND FURNISIDNGS OF CENTRAL ASIANS IN CHINA" (PDF). Sino-Platonic Papers. 168.
