= Museum of East Asian Art (Cologne) =

- Museum für Ostasiatische Kunst
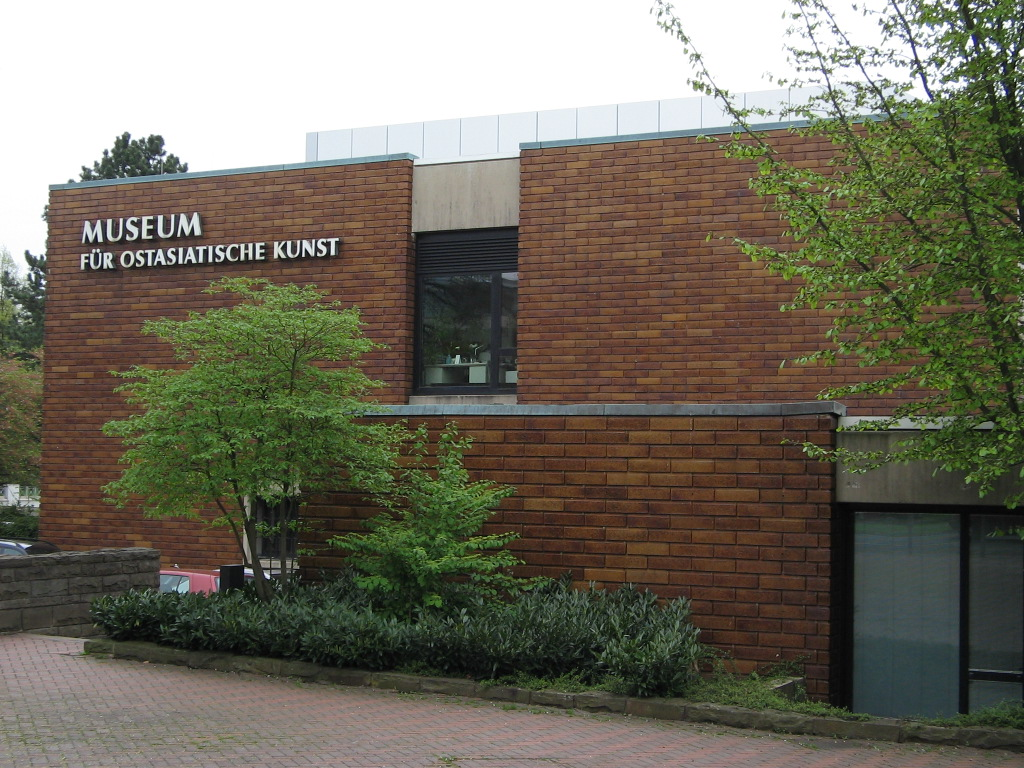
- Interactive map of the Museum of East Asian Art area

General information
- Location: Universitätsstrasse 100, Cologne, Germany
- Coordinates: 50°56′06″N 6°55′32″E
- Opened: 1913

Design and construction
- Architect: Kunio Maekawa

Website
- Official website

The Museum of East Asian Art (Museum für Ostasiatische Kunst Köln) opened in Cologne, Germany in 1913 and is the oldest of its kind in the country. The collection of Chinese, Korean, and Japanese art originates in that of its founders Adolf Fischer (de) (1856–1914) and his wife Frieda (de) (1874–1945). The new building by architect Kunio Maekawa, pupil of Le Corbusier, opened in 1977.

== See also ==
- List of museums in Cologne
- Museum of Asian Art
