= Sogdian art =

Art from Greater Iran

Sogdian art

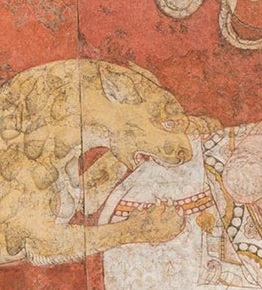
Detail from the painted murals of Varakhsha in the Bukhara oasis in Sogdia. The painting is located in one of the Varakhsha Palace's main rooms, the "Red Hall". Late 7th or early 8th century.

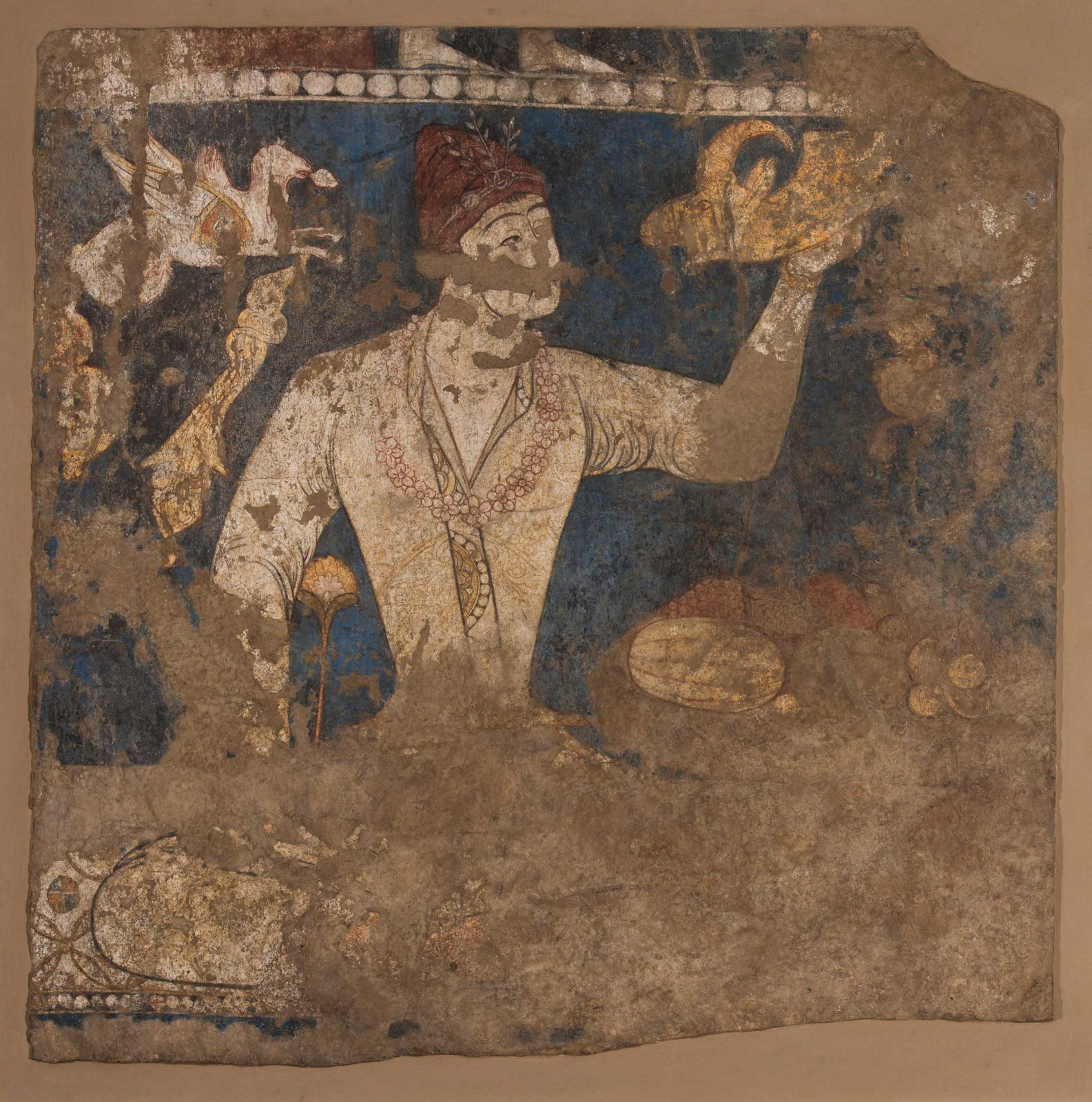
Banqueter holding a rhyton in a wall painting at Panjikent, ancient Sogdiana, first half of the 8th century AD.

Sogdian art refers to art produced by the Sogdians, an Iranian people living mainly in ancient Sogdia, present-day Uzbekistan, Tajikistan, Kazakhstan, and Kyrgyzstan, who also had a large diaspora living in China. Its apex was between the 5th and 9th centuries, and it consists of a rich body of pre-Muslim Central Asian visual arts. New finds recovered in the past decades allowed scholars to achieve a better understanding of Sogdian art.

Sogdians are best known for their painting, although they excelled also in other fields, such as metalworking and music. Their metalworking, which influenced the Chinese, is sometimes confused with Sasanian metalwork. However, characteristics of Sogdian metalwork, differentiating it from Sasanian metalwork, have been established; for example, with respect to Sasanian metalwork, the designs of Sogdian vessels are more dynamic, and their productions less massive. They differ in technique and shape, as well as iconography.

The Sogdians loved to recount stories, and their art is much "narrative" in nature. They lived in houses on whose walls they hung wood carvings and painted refined murals. Because the purpose of the Sogdians was to convey narrative, they would include only the essentials, setting the scene with lines, blocks of color, and a few landscape elements, creating an "easy-to-read two-dimensionality that helps advance the progress of the depicted tale."

== Overview ==
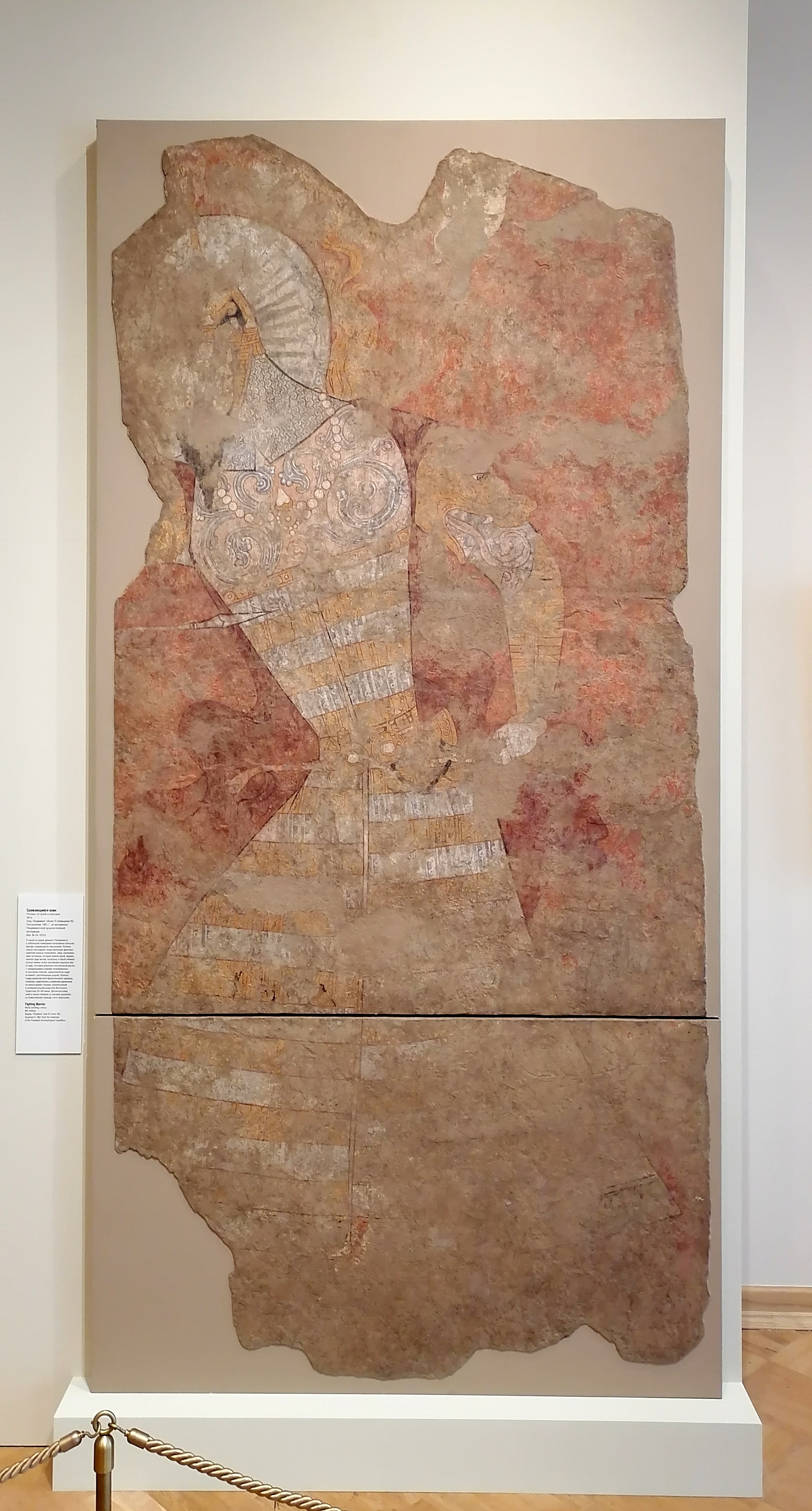
Sogdian mural of an armoured warrior

Sogdian art was produced chiefly in Sogdia. The best known examples of Sogdian art are found at Pendzhikent and Varakhsha, in ancient Sogdania. These towns were once principalities in Sogdania. Sogdian culture was a distinct culture with its own features, but it received influence from different streams, notably Sasanian culture, and post-Gupta India. In turn, Sogdian culture influenced neighboring cultures, like Chinese culture.

For their dwelling places, the Sogdians preferred to produce paintings and wood carvings. Sogdian wall paintings are bright, vigorous, and of remarkable beauty, but they also tell about Sogdian life. They reproduce, for example, the costumes of the day, the gaming equipment, and the harness. They depict stories and epics drawing on Iranian, Near Eastern (Manichaean, Nestorian) and Indian themes. Sogdian religious art reflects the religious affiliations of the Sogdians, and this knowledge is derived mostly from paintings and ossuaries. Through these artifacts, it is possible to "experience the vibrancy of Sogdian life and imagination."

Sogdian art ceased with the Islamic invasion.

== Painting ==
There are recurring elements distinctive of Sogdian art that appear in Sogdian metalwork, clay and wood sculpture, as well as throughout mural painting. Sogdian artists, and patrons, were very attentive to social life, displaying it in their works. Thus, banqueting, hunting, and entertainment are recurrent in their representations. The Sogdians were storytellers: they were passionate about recounting stories, and the interiors of their abodes were decorated with narrative paintings.

The Sogdians also came into contact with different foreign cultures, because of their commercial activities. They were aware of cultures different from their own culture and accepted them, as is shown in their works. They had a "unique vision of the divine and afterlife", and their religious art was extremely diverse. Thus, the "interconnectedness with other Eurasian cultures is especially apparent in Sogdian religious art."

Many Sogdian paintings were lost or destroyed in time, and the land was subject to invasions from Turks, Hepthalites, Arabs, and Mongols. Only a few Sogdian murals have been rediscovered so far.

The Afrasiab murals, now in the Afrasiab Museum of Samarkand on the Afrāsiāb mound, was discovered in 1965 when the local authorities decided the construction of a road in the middle of Afrāsiāb mound, the old site of pre-Mongol Samarkand. These murals were probably painted in the middle of the 7th century AD. They stretch over four walls of the room of a private house. Three or four countries in neighbouring Central Asia are depicted. On the northern wall there is a Chinese scene, with the Empress on a boat, and the Emperor hunting; on the Southern Wall, Samarkand, the Iranian world, with a religious funerary procession in honor of the ancestors during the Nowruz festival; and India is shown on the eastern wall. These murals are evidence of the Sogdians' desire to depict the world around them.

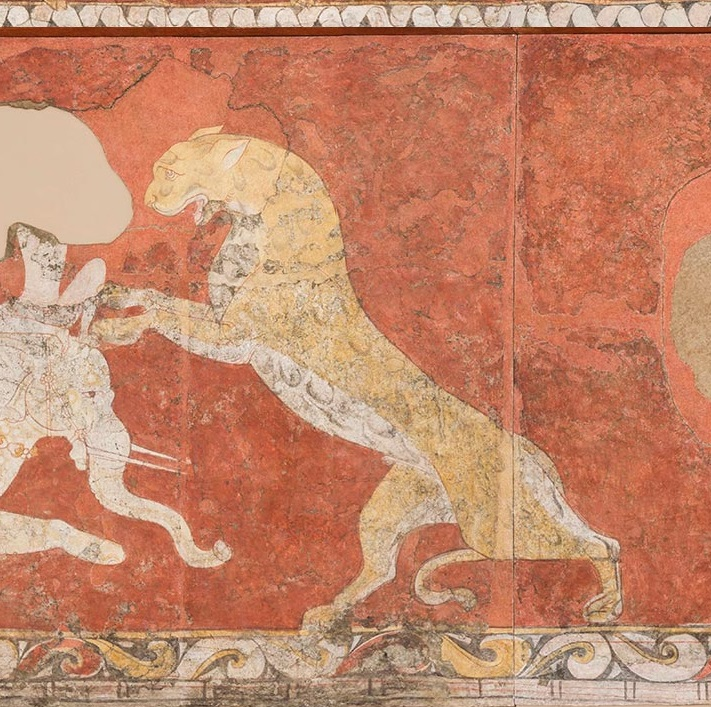
Detail from the Varakhsha murals, late 7th or early 8th century.

The Penjikent murals are another known example of Sogdian painting, discovered in Panjakent (ancient Sogdania, present-day Tajikistan), and now on display at the Hermitage Museum in Saint Petersburg, and in the National Museum of Antiquities of Tajikistan in Dushanbe. These murals are the earliest known Sogdian murals, dating to the late 5th to early 6th century AD. In them, scenes of festivals abound. It is also thought that the narrative of the Iranian Shahnameh and the epic cycle of Rostam is mirrored in a series of murals ("Rustemiada", "Blue Hall") at Penjikent dating to the first half of the 8th century. There are divinities in the Penjikent murals whose identity is unknown. Among them is a goddess with four arms sitting on a dragon in one version, and on a throne supported by dragons in another. In a third version she is seated on a lion and holds the moon and the sun in her hands. This goddess was also depicted in other private houses. Another deity with blue skin was identified with Shiva. The Penjikent murals are evidence of the Sogdians' desire to depict the mythological and supernatural world. There is a dramatic painting called the Mourning Scene, depicting women bending over the deceased and cutting their hair (and their visages) in sorrow. To the left of the mourning women there is also a female figure with several arms, whose halo suggests she is a divinity. Beside this divinity, another figure with a halo is dousing a torch as they kneel down. There are several interpretations of the scene, with most scholars believing the figure with several arms to be Nana. The Zoroastrians avoided displaying grief due to their beliefs, and this painting further shows how Sogdian Mazdaism diverged from the traditional Sasanian Persian tradition.

The Sogdians' desire to portray the supernatural and natural worlds "extended into portraying their own world." However, they did not "represent their mercantile activities, a major source of their wealth, but instead chose to show their enjoyment of it, such as the scenes of banqueting at Panjikent. In these paintings we see how the Sogdians saw themselves."

The Varakhsha paintings are another known example of Sogdian painting. They were discovered in Varakhsha, in the fortified country palace of the Bukhara rulers. Varakhsha was an important Sogdian center. The so-called Red Hall of the palace was probably decorated in the late 7th century. It consists of a painted frieze in two registers. Today only low portions of the upper one survive, but a large part of the main frieze was preserved. In the upper one, there is a procession of real and imaginary animals saddled and mounted by divinities. In the main frieze, a god riding an elephant battles against monsters against a red background. The latter image is thought to derive from Hindu iconography. This assumption is based on the elephant mount and the turban worn by the god. However, it is clear that the artists of Varakhsha had never seen an elephant. The elephants have small proportions, are stubby, have "pawlike legs, and tusks that grow from their lower jaw." Further, they are saddled like horses.

The Varakhsha paintings survived the Arab invasion, and some of them endured up to the time when the region became definitively under Muslim rule. There are figural and ornamental stuccos found in Varakhsha, one depicting a mouflon ram. They probably date to after the Arab invasion, because the Sogdians usually used clay, while stucco was a medium preferred by the Sasanians. It is likely that the use of stucco was introduced with the Arab invasion after they conquered Persia.

The production of paintings stopped in 722 AD with the invasion of the Abbasid Caliphate, in the Muslim conquest of Transoxiana, and many works of art were damaged or destroyed at that time.

Beside the production of paintings, the narrative desire of the Sogdians is prevalent also in funerary artifacts, such as carved and painted stone beds and sarcophagi of Sogdian emigrees who worked and died in China. This narrative purpose meant that "Sogdian artists would include only the essentials. Lines, blocks of color, and a few landscape elements to set the scene create an easy-to-read two-dimensionality that helps advance the progress of the depicted tale." This style's origin may be seen in two bone plaques found in Orlat, Uzbekistan, on which a war scene is depicted. This artifact, the Orlat Plaques, was found in the tomb of a nomad, and is considered a masterpiece of Sogdian art. In it, Sogdians of Samarkand are depicted intent in repelling nomadic attacks, which were a real threat for Sogdians. According to Mode, this plaque is a very early manifestation of the narrative imagery which characterizes Sogdian art.

== Sculpture ==
In Panjikent a painted frieze with elaborate figures of humans, dragons and sea creatures was found. In it are "Hindu makaras, or combinations of land and sea beasts; Greco-Roman hippocamps, or fish-tailed horses; and human-headed anguipeds whose 'legs' are serpents. Such marine imagery seems odd for landlocked Panjikent, but it may refer to an imported myth or a view of an alternate afterlife."

=== Ossuaries ===
Ossuary of Durman Tepe, 7th or early 8th century

The Sogdian ossuaries were made with molds, that were pressed on baked clay. Because the molds were later reused by less experienced artists, some later ossuaries are of a quality that is inferior to the originals.

With the decoration of ossuaries, the Sogdians expressed their wishes for the afterlife. As per Mazdaism practice, the body of the deceased would be excarnated and the bones then placed in a container, the ossuary, which was then put into a naos. Ossuaries were generally made of terracotta. The lid can be flat, pyramidal, or domed. They were often covered with slip, used like paint. Almost all decorations have to do with the soul's journey in the afterlife, and portray religious tenets and practices. The 7th/8th century ossuary from Mulla kurgan has a pyramidal lid with a couple standing beneath moon and sun and carrying a branch on each side, while a priest is depicted on each of the ossuary main body's side. The figures on the lid may be dancing, thus "alluding to the pleasures of paradise, a place of music and song."

There is a more complex composition that is the subject of a number of fragmented ossuaries spread from Bukhara to Samarkand, which date from the late 6th century to the early 8th. The Durman Tepe ossuary displays incredible attention to detail. The Durman Tepe ossuary is of good quality, especially when compared to the work of later, less experienced artists who reused the moulds, and comes close to the original. The identity of the figures depicted on it hasn't yet been established.

The Shahr-i Sabz Oasis ossuary (Sogdian Kesh, south of Samarkand) depicts, like several others, the journey of the soul to paradise, with each low relief figure conveying a specific part of the journey. This ossuary presents the Zoroastrian eschatology, with death, judgment, and final destiny of the soul.

== Seals ==
Sogdian merchants would own at least one seal, just like merchants from the neighboring societies. The value of the seal was equivalent to that of a signature, and both were used to authenticate documents, cupboards, doors and other productions.

As with the paintings, not many Sogdian seals have survived, especially when compared to the Sassanian. On these seals, the Sogdians portrayed themselves. The portrait often depicts only the owner, but it can also depict a couple. The seals thus give an idea of how the Sogdians looked, or saw themselves.

Among the seals positively identified as Sogdian is that of a bearded man with short, combed hair. The curls frame his face and descend over the neck, and the man, portrayed in profile, wears an earring and a garment open at the neck.

== Metalworking ==
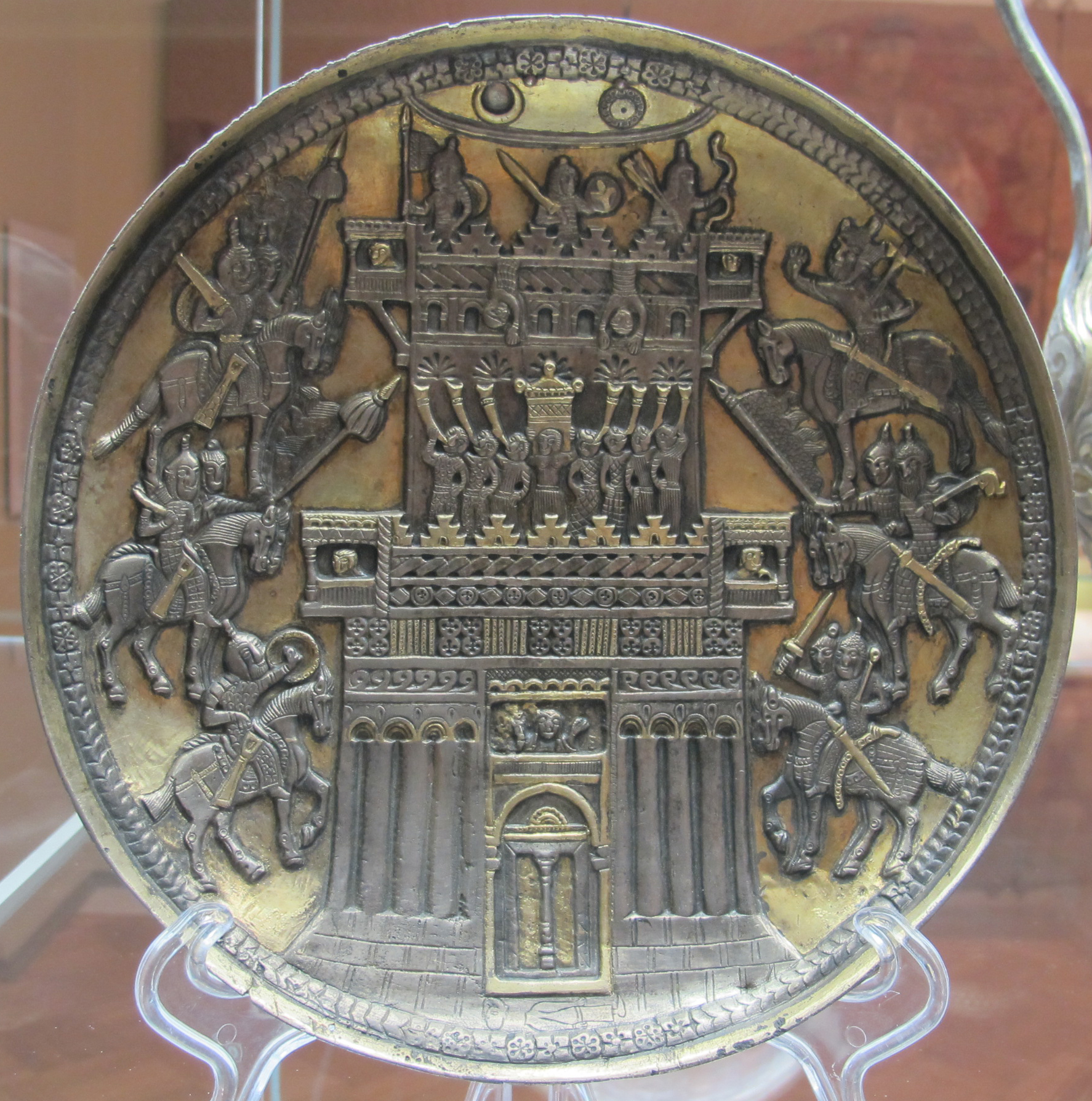
Anikova dish: Nestorian Christian plate with decoration of the Siege of Jericho, probably by Sogdian artists under Karluk dominion, in Semirechye. Cast silver of the 9th-10th century, copied from an original 8th century plate.

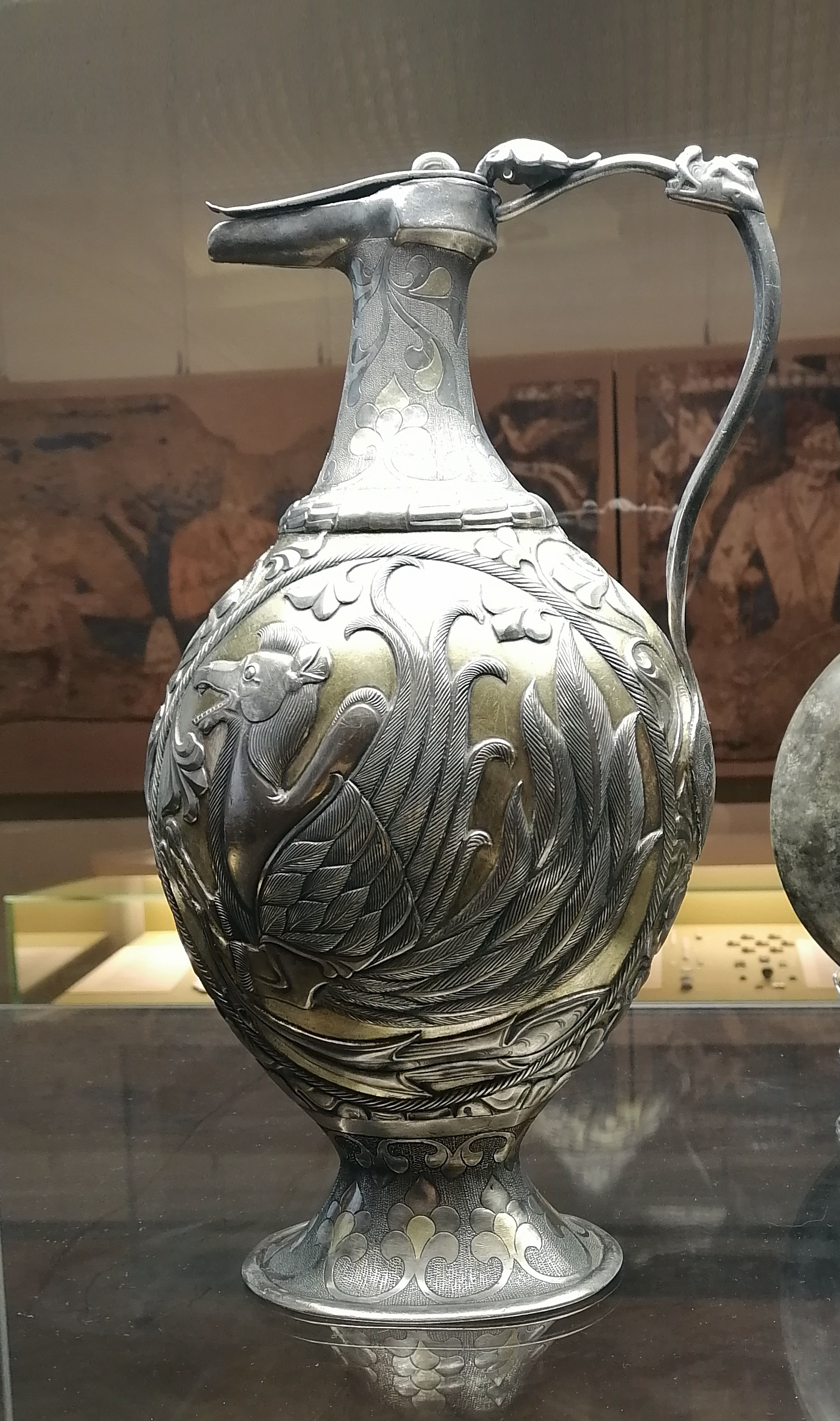
Ewer with winged camels, end of the 7th, early 8th centuries.

The Sogdians particularly excelled in metalworking. Their capacity in this art influenced Chinese metalwork. In particular, the Chinese metalwork was influenced by the techniques and shapes of the Sogdian metalwork style. This influence came to pass both through Sogdian imports in China and Sogdian craftsmen moving to and working in China.

Even after the armed advent of Islam, Sogdian metalworking continued in Muslim Iran and Muslim Central Asia.

Sogdian metalwork may be confused with Sasanian metalwork, and the two are still confused by some scholars. However, they differ in technique and shape, as well as iconography. Thanks to the work of archaeologist Boris Marshak, several characteristic of Sogdian metalwork have been established: with respect to Sasanian vessels, Sogdian productions are less massive and their shape differs from the Sasanian, as do the techniques employed in their production. Further, the designs of Sogdian productions are more dynamic.

Most of Sogdian metalwork that has been excavated so far dates to the late Sogdian period, that is to the late 7th and 8th centuries. The Sogdians preferred medallions, portraying a single animal, while the static figures of kings, popular among Sasanians, figure in Sogdian metalwork only in the 8th century, after the invasion of the Arabs, carrying the Sasanian influence with them.

Most of the metalwork discovered so far is made of silver, although the Sogdians also fashioned vessels in gold. However, only one vessel in gold has survived, dating to the 7th/8th century. Its handle is very similar to that of the famous Sogdian ewer emblazoned with a winged camel.

The quality of their work was so good that their productions were traded extensively. Sogdian silver vessels have been found throughout Asia along the Silk Route and the Northern Fur Route, stretching from Cherson in Crimea to deep inside China.

However, Sogdian vessels have not been found in Iran so far, due to a block on Sogdian imports by the Sasanians, in order to preserve supremacy in their own markets. The Chinese once remarked that the Sogdians "go wherever profit is to be found." Later, the Sogdians induced the Turks, the new rulers, to open a market of Sogdian silk in Byzantium. They convinced the Turks to send a delegation via northern routes, thus avoiding Sasanian territory, to Constantinople to reach a deal.

=== Influence on the Chinese ===
Sogdian metalwork greatly influenced the Chinese. This happened both through imports from Sogdia and through Sogdian artists working in China. Sogdian influence "can be seen in the flat ring-matted background of Tang-period metalwork." This was "reproduced on Tang-period ceramic ewers, themselves inspired by the shape of the Sogdian ewer." The Tang silversmiths would imitate the shape of the Sogdian artworks, and notable examples are two silver cups (now at the Freer Gallery of Art), a vessel similar to the fluted lion bowl, and a 6th-century wine service.

The Sogdians traded in silk, and also other goods like Indian gemstones, horses from Ferghana Valley, furs from the northern steppes and musk from Tibet, beside the famous "golden peaches of Samarkand" in Chinese poetry. The Sogdians were also "skilled artisans, making and selling luxurious objects—particularly metalwork and textiles—across the Asian steppe and into China." Thus the Chinese were not the only patrons of the Sogdians. There is a Sogdian-made silver cup decorated with goats and vegetation, made by a Sogdian craftsman belonging to a particular school of metalwork ("characterized by the ropelike border of the roundels that enclose each goat, the alternating leafy and half-palmettes, and the flat, ring-matted pattern on the neck") whose motif, which may have been picked to "please a Turkic patron," is a pair of grappling wrestlers, engraved on the thumb rest. The cup might've been used by the customer while watching wrestling.

== Textile arts ==
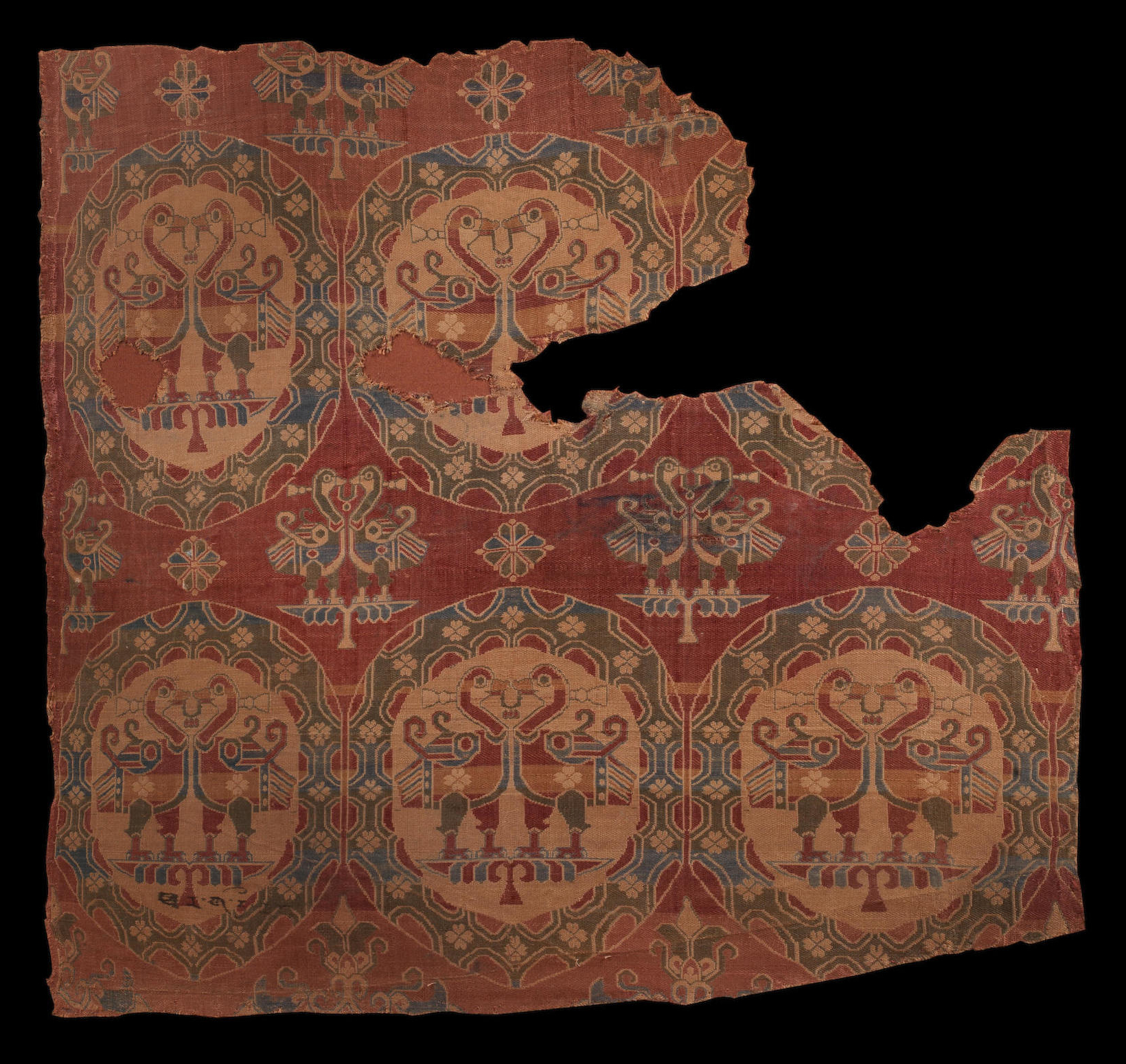
Sogdian woven silk fragment, early 8th century

Among the goods traded by the Sogdians, skilled artists but also adventurous merchants, was tapestry, which they exported, among other places, to China, where their artistic skills would have a fundamental influence. As mentioned, the Sogdians even attempted to export their silk products to the Sasanian Empire where, however, to protect their own productions, a "blockade" was probably enacted by the Sasanians.

The Sogdians colonized strategic points along the trade routes. Silks woven with Sogdian patterns were found in Khojo, Dunhuang, Dulan, and Turpan. As early as in the 6th century, the Chinese started to adopt the Sogdian patterns, although, at this time, they still kept the traditional technique. According to the Book of Sui, in the year 605, the head of the ateliers producing silks in the "western style" in Sichuan (the then western frontier of imperial China) was a certain He Chou, a name which betrays his Sogdian origins (see Sichuan embroidery). A major revolution happened later. As the Sogdians moved to China and their communities flourished there, they brought their expertise and art in the textiles with them. The renowned Chinese kesi, "an extremely fine silk tapestry woven on a small loom with a needle as a shuttle", was the result of this influence, and it reached its height during the Song dynasty. At first, this technique was chiefly used to protect scrolls containing paintings. It was also employed as a support for paintings, later going on to become an esteemed art form. This art form had an important influence on China, and flourished between the eleventh and thirteenth centuries.

The Sogdians had their own fashion and dresses, generally made of woven silks and cotton, although few dresses have been uncovered, mostly due to their religion, which forbade burial. For woven fabric the common patterns were rosettes to stripes and plaids and their "pearl roundel".

== Music ==
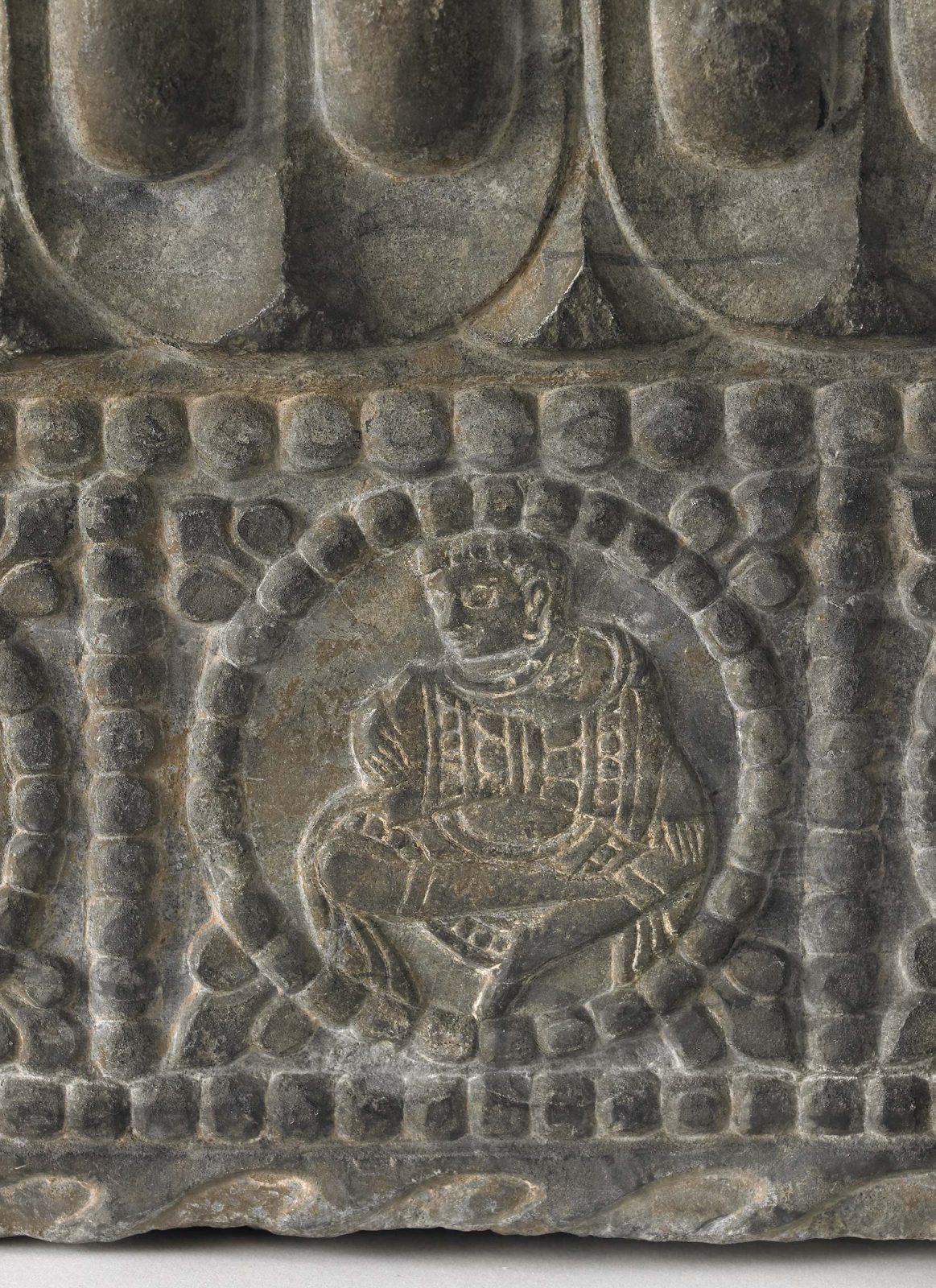
Detail of Sogdian musician playing hourglass drum on the Anyang funerary bed, China.

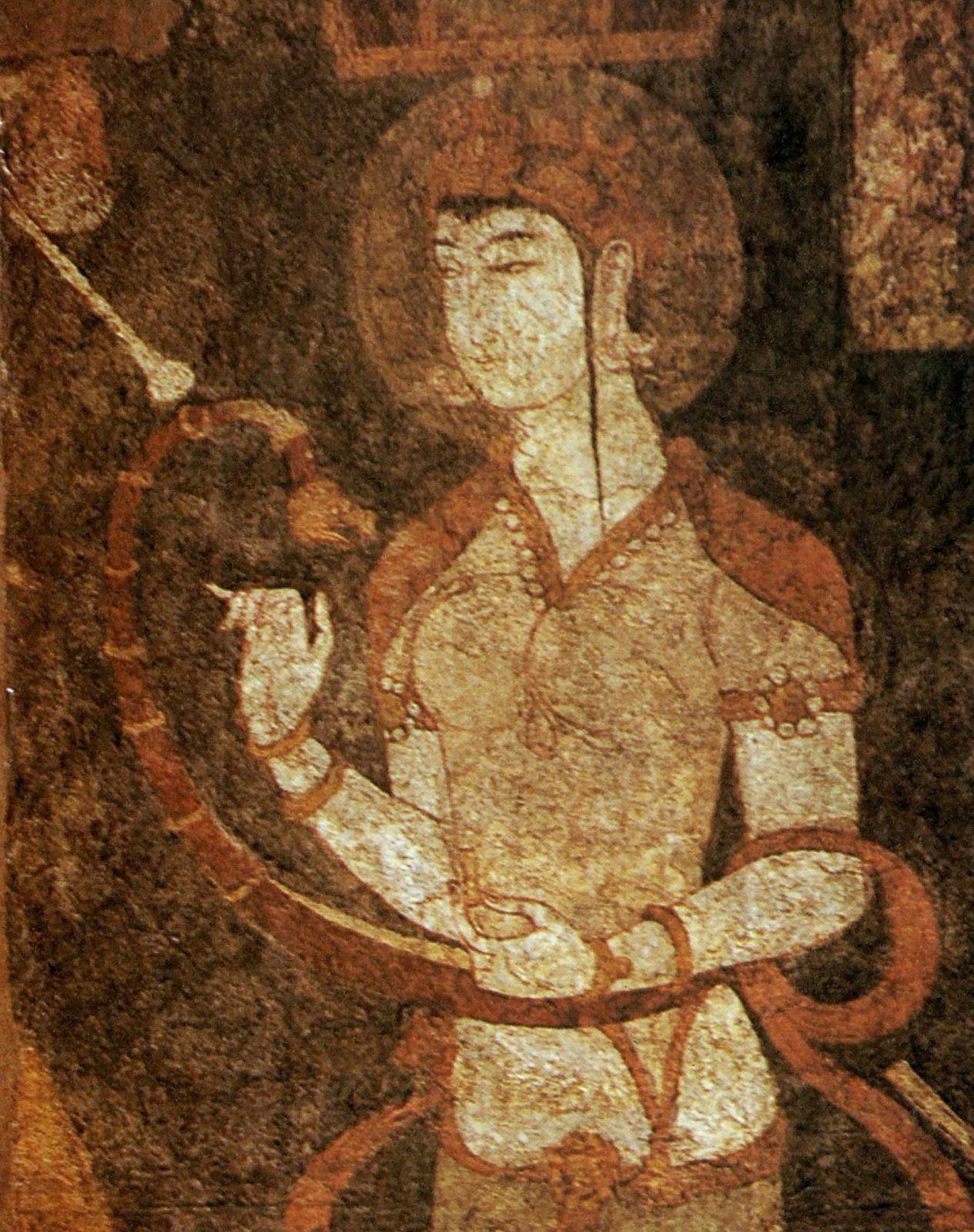
Woman playing a bowed harp in a Sogdian painting

Although the original Sogdian melodies are now lost, there are a number of elements that can help to achieve a good understanding of the music they produced. The Sogdian merchants traveled across Asia during at least most of the first millennium AD, bringing with them their instruments and musical style. They traveled to China, introducing new styles therein. Sogdian music flourished both in China and in the Chinese court.

Music was an important part of Sogdian culture, as shown by finds of terracotta figures in local, Sogdian sites, which date to the 4th century BC. Lute players dating to this time have been found in Afrasiab (modern Samarkand). The lutes carried by these figures are in different shapes, and it is thought that the Sogdian lutes were played with a plectrum. A type resembles much a modern guitar. The most common lute type in these findings resembles the Chinese pipa, first mentioned in Chinese sources as late as in the 2nd century AD, and which modern scholars believe is not of Chinese origin. The earliest among the 4th century BC Sogdian findings are lute players.

Other figures, depicting angular harps (transverse and end-blown) have been unearthed in Afrasiab, as well as other Sogdian cities. The core instruments in Sogdian groups were lutes, angular harps, drums, and flutes.

It was in the 4th century AD that Sogdian communities in China started to particularly flourish. The Sogdians had established trade communities throughout China: from Gansu, they started to spread eastwards. The leading Sogdian merchants, the sabao (萨保 / 薩保), were appointed community leaders. They were buried in tombs with stone beds and sarcophagi that, like Sogdian ossuaries and painting, depicted the pleasures of the material world and of the next life. Sogdian funerary furniture found in China typically features religious, Buddhist and/or Zoroastrian themes, banquet/feasting, or processions and hunting.

The Anyang funerary bed, acquired in parts by different museums, is decorated with musicians in the typical Sogdian attire and with a Buddhist scene including deities. The ensemble of Sogdian musicians includes two lute players, a flutist, two drummers and a cymbal player, as well as two dancers. Two stretchers once attached to the bed showed what the Chinese called a huxuan wu (胡旋舞), i.e. "Sogdian Whirl dance", which was enormously popular in China, and appears on many Chinese tombs. Tang sources confirm the dance's popularity. It was performed at court by the Tang Chinese emperor Xuanzong and his favorite concubine.

The Sogdians are thought to have also performed on an animals' backs at times. What traces remain of Sogdian music "may still be present to this day in the music of the pipa, and in a number of Silk Road-themed dance and music ensembles."

== Architecture ==
Reconstruction of reception hall of a Panjikent house

The architecture of fortified places was similar to that of the houses of well to do residents. The reception halls would have included pilasters and the sculpture of an important divinity on the side immediate opposite to the entrance. The larger-than-life-size image of the divinity was of the one that the owner of the house venerated.

The walls of the houses of wealthy Panjikenters were usually covered with four zones of murals. Running around the room was the sufa, where the host and guests could sit and talk. The sufa was a clay bench covered in plaster. Above the sufa was the lowest zone or register. Thus, on the hall's walls were the "narrative" murals. The room was sealed above by a domed ceiling, and its surface would've been decorated by carvings in wood.

The city of Balasagun, in modern-day Kyrgyzstan, was built by the Sogdians, and their language was still in use in this town until the 11th century. All that remains of Balasagun today is the Burana Tower, whose exact original use is unclear.

The Sogdian temple of Jartepa, standing on the route between Samarkand and Penjikent, was built in the 5th century from a rural fortified mansion, and existed until the early 8th century, before the Arab conquest. It was built at the same time as the more famous Penjikent, but its architecture is said to have better preserved. The building has remarkable size and rich interior design. In it were found several murals and other finds, though the temple was likely robbed.

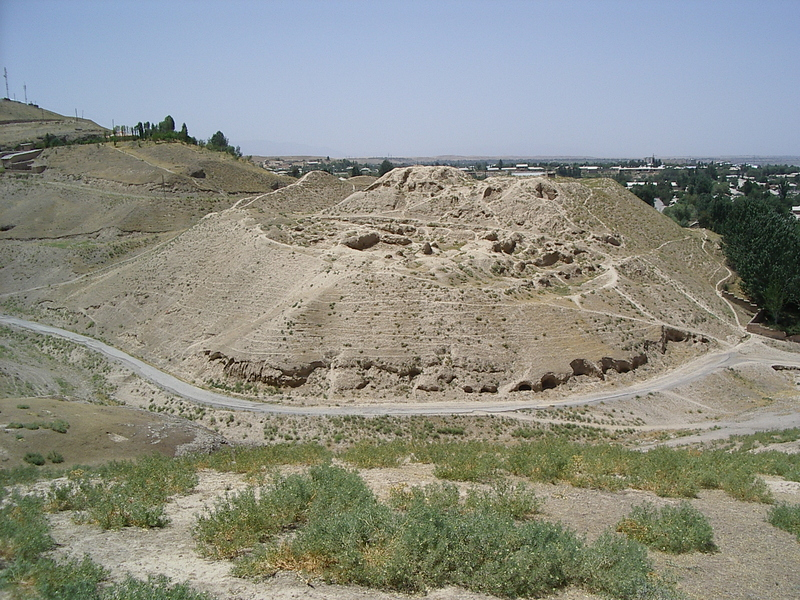
Ruins of Panjakent

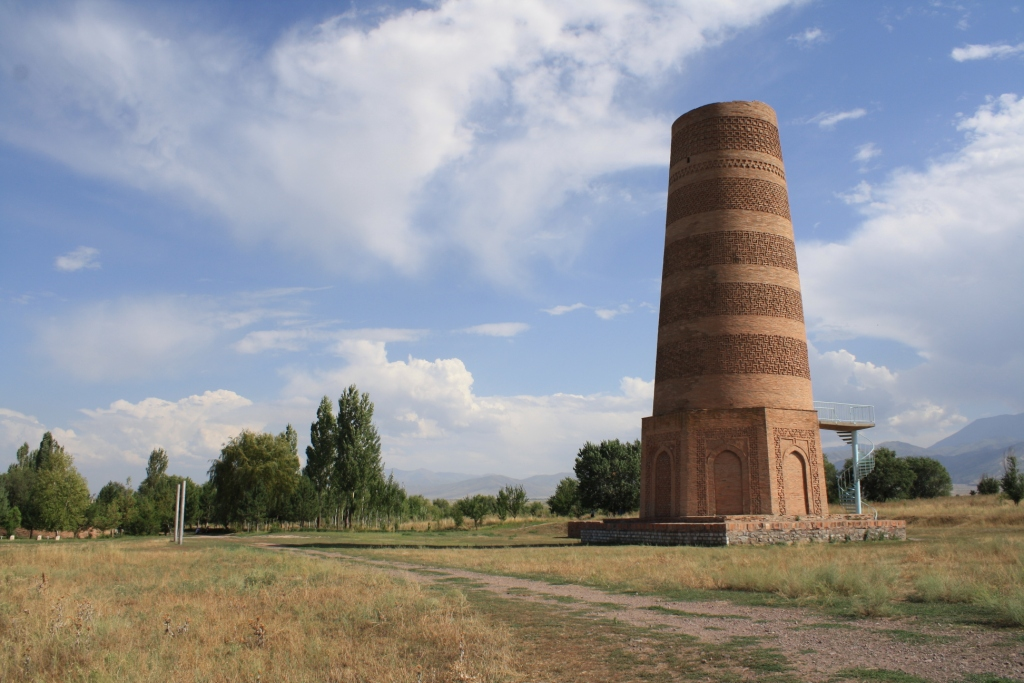
Burana Tower, what remains of Balasagun

The ruins of the ancient Sogdian city of Panjakent today lie in the outskirts of the modern city. In Panjakent numerous finds were discovered, including the Penjikent murals. Two temples were built in Panjakent in the 5th century, dedicated to certain gods, in which a local form of paganism, strongly influenced by Zoroastrianism, was in use. In their halls were niches in which statues, now lost, were placed. One of the rites performed in the temple, which was in use until the Arab invasion, was the lightening of fire before representations of the divinities, similarly as in the private houses, where the fire, set in the main room, also provided warmth. One temple (the southern one) had a portico (eyvan) leading to a hall with statues set in niches.

In time, there were modifications, which however did not change the basic structure of the temples, with the ritual remaining substantially the same. Additional chapels built at the temple suggest that new cults were introduced, and the practices became more complicated. In the other building other sanctuaries were built on its southern side. One likely had a continuously burning fire. A courtyard was located at the southeastern end of the platform, which was originally painted. In the temple there was a pilaster-altar similar to a Sasanian altar, however, no traces of fire have been found on it, nor on the surrounding walls. Hence, it probably had another use. There was once a large tree near this altar, possibly a pistachio tree or a willow. A wall was later built against the southern facade of the temple platform, blocking the yard with the tree. The other room formed by the new wall had three wide steps leading to a niche. Below the first step, set into the floor, there was a grinding wheel. On the north wall there was a niche with tritons decorating the pedestal, depicted as supporting it. Such image could indicate a connection with water for this sanctuary. More sanctuaries were later added to the temple, especially on the southern part of the platform. There is a hall, the way leading to it being rather complicated, with special openings. It contains a temple, in which today Parsis say prayers. The special openings allowed the worshipers to see the fire as they prayed. In an important place, close by the atashgah, there is a room with neither niches nor sculptures, whose original purpose is unknown. After a "special house" for the fire was introduced, the rituals became quite complicated. With the introduction of a new sanctuary later in time, the rituals became yet more complicated. At a time coinciding with the Hepthalite invasion (6th century) the walls of the city were demolished and the temple underwent changes. Some sanctuaries were blocked and a pylon was built over the sacred fire. It is possible that, after the invasion, the population returned to some earlier rituals which didn't require the eternal fire. Sogdian terminology and the many images of gods suggest that the temples were considered by Sogdians "the house of the gods," similarly to the Greeks. According to Marshak, there was technology in the temple that allowed to raise the image of a god. There was also a room that was possibly assigned to theatrical effects. It is possible that the rituals had a theatrical nature, including special effects, with the Sogdians possibly performing religious/mythological scenes. Two murals (found in a chapel and in the courtyard), dating to the 6th century, confirm the practice of theatrical worship. All works at the temple were funded by private donors. In the temple there was also a bakery.

== Gallery ==
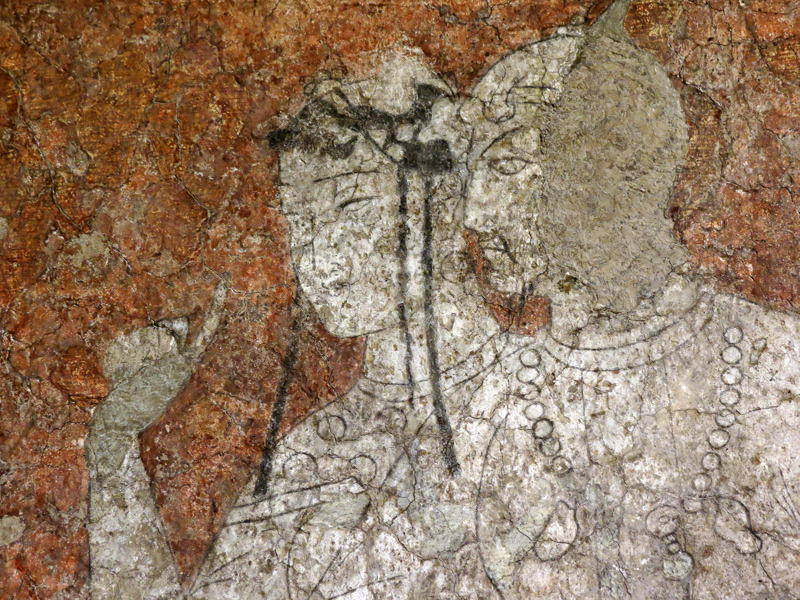
Detail from the Penjikent murals, 5th-7th century AD

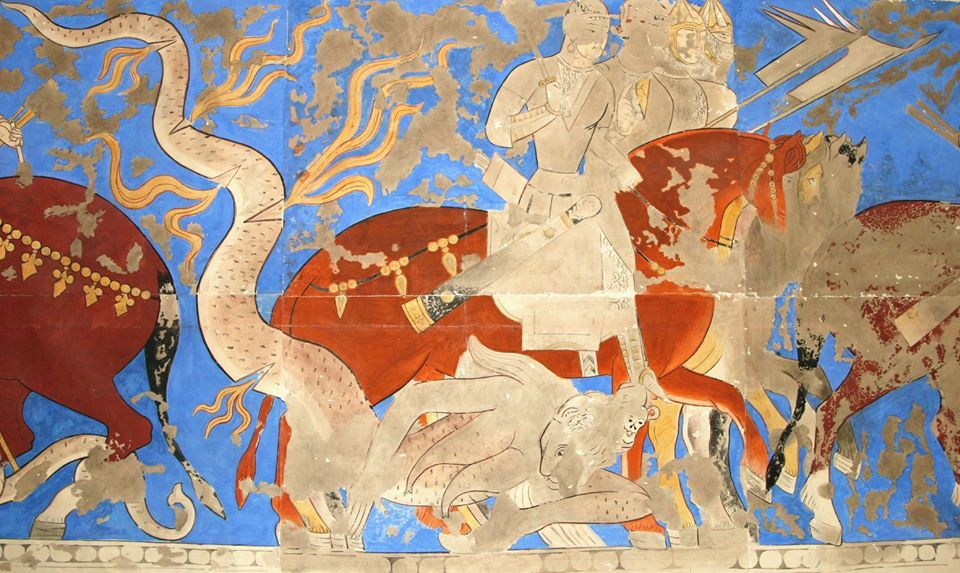
Mural from Penjikent, 5th-8th century

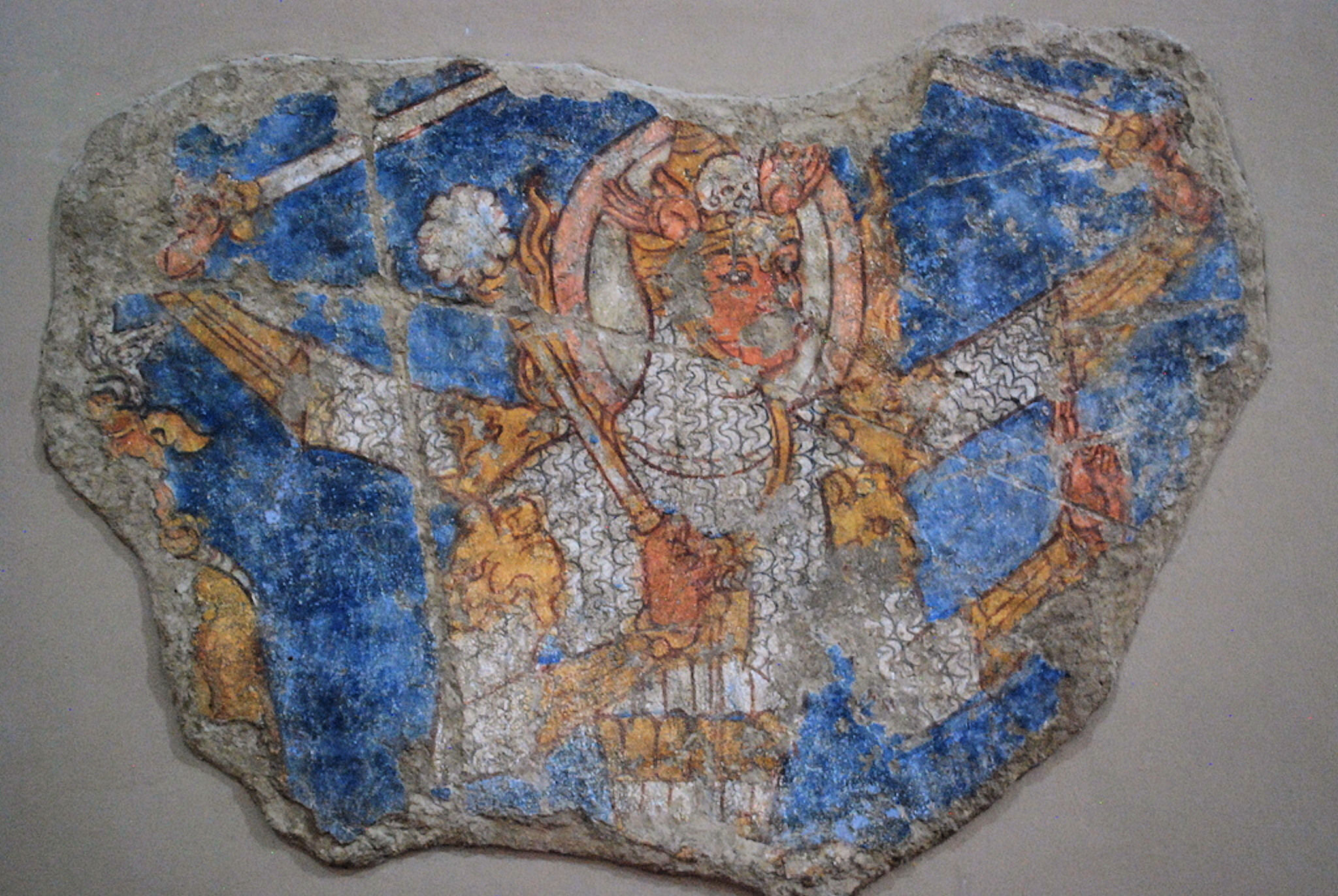
Detail from the Penjikent murals, 5th-7th century AD

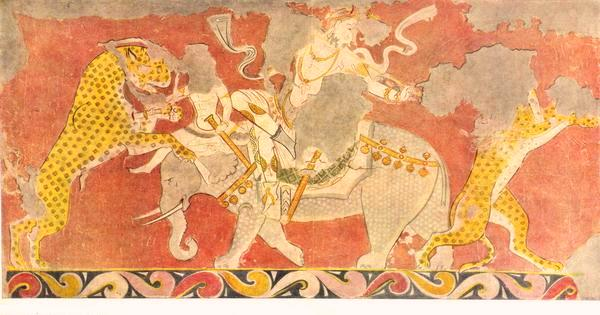
Mural from the Red Room in Varakhsha, 7th or early 8th century

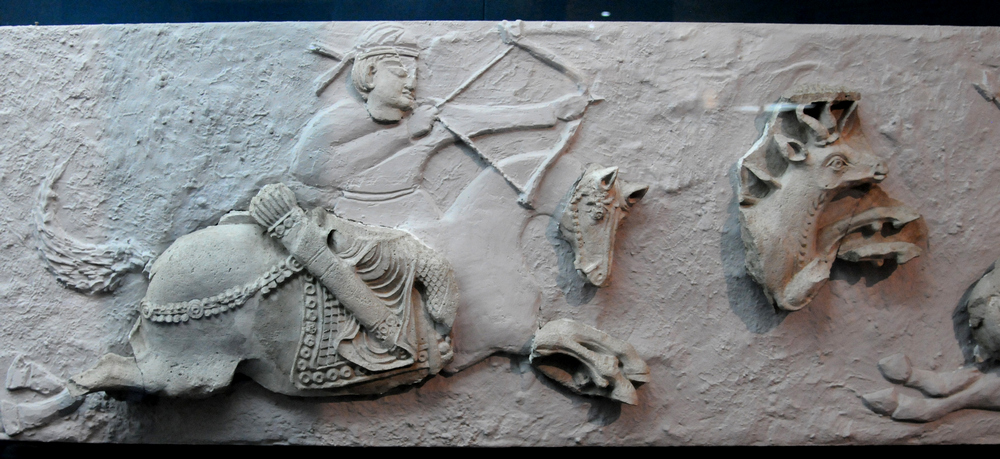
Relief of a hunter, Varakhsha, Sogdia, 5th-7th century AD

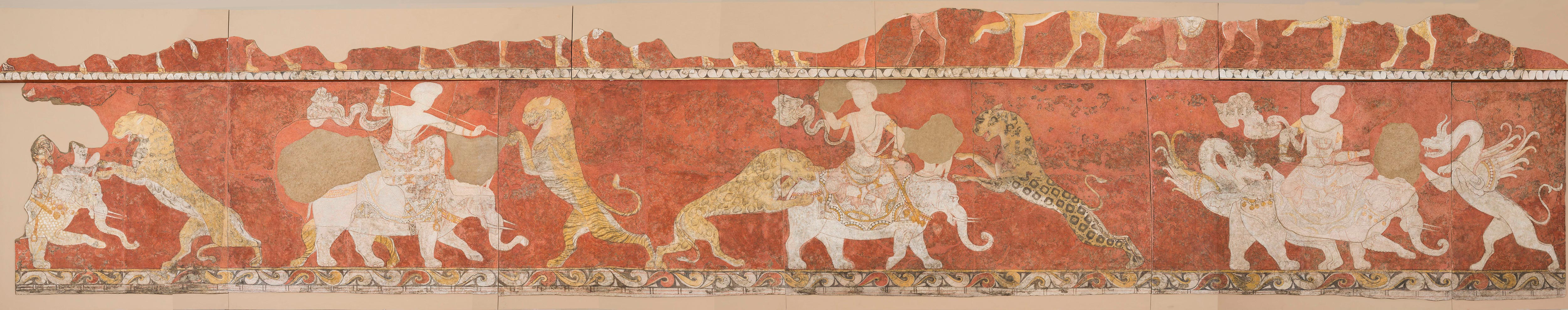
The Wall Paintings in the Palace at Varakhsha

== See also ==
- Afrasiab murals
- Penjikent murals
