= Tomb of Yu Hong =

Sui-dynasty tomb of a Central Asian

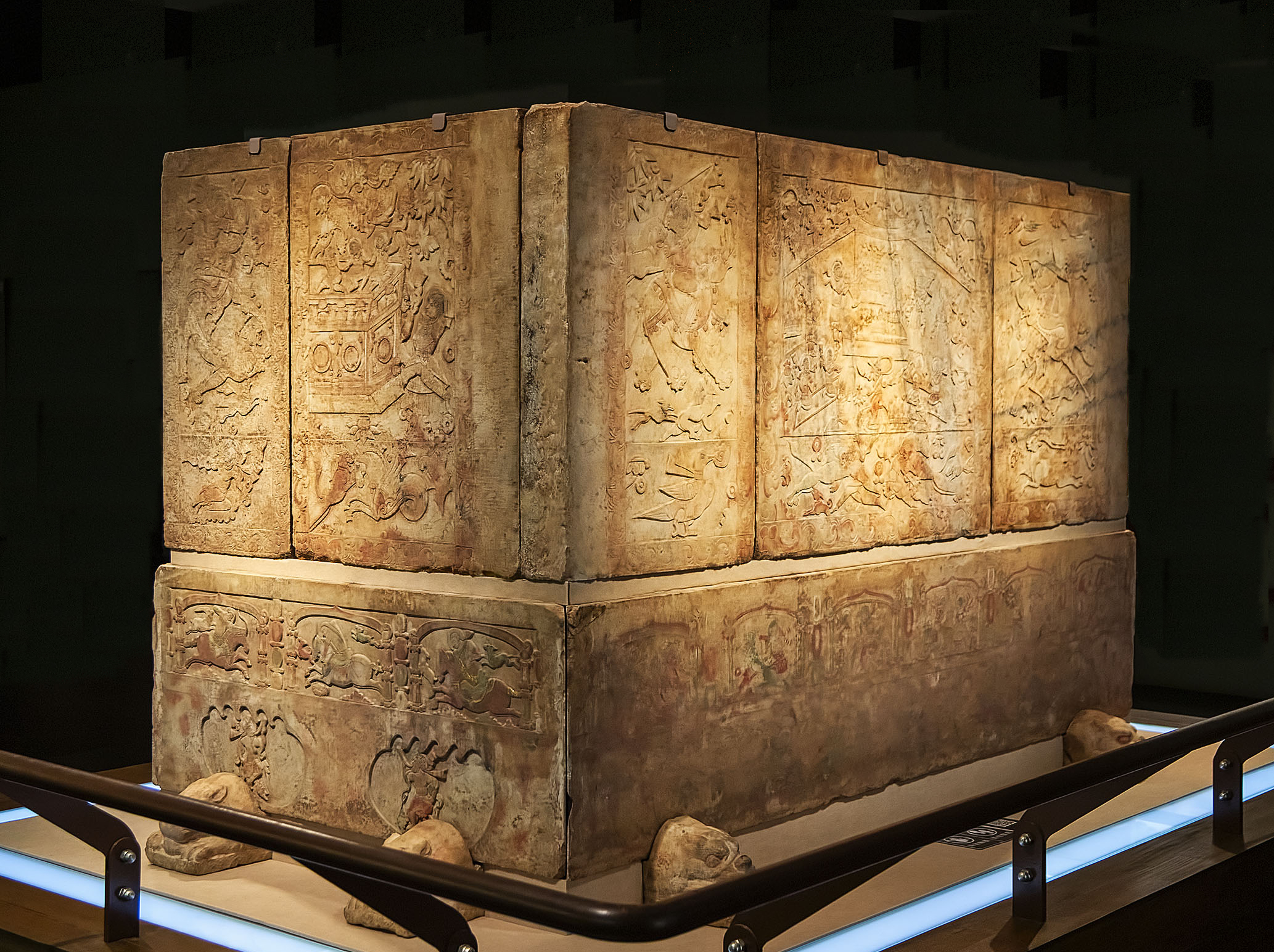
- The rear of the marble sarcophagus of Yu Hong, in Shanxi Museum. The sarcophagus was originally covered with a hip-gable roof.
- Created: 6th century CE

Location

The Tomb of Yu Hong (Chinese: 虞弘墓; pinyin: Yú Hóng Mù; Wade–Giles: Yü^{2}-Hung^{2}-Mu^{4}) is the grave of Yu Hong and his wife, dating back to 592 AD (Sui dynasty). The tomb was discovered by some locals in 1999 in Wangguo village in Jinyuan district of the city of Taiyuan, it was subsequently excavated officially in July of the same year. This tomb is so far the only archaeological find in the Central Plains region that reflects Central Asian (Western Regions) culture.

== Tomb occupant ==
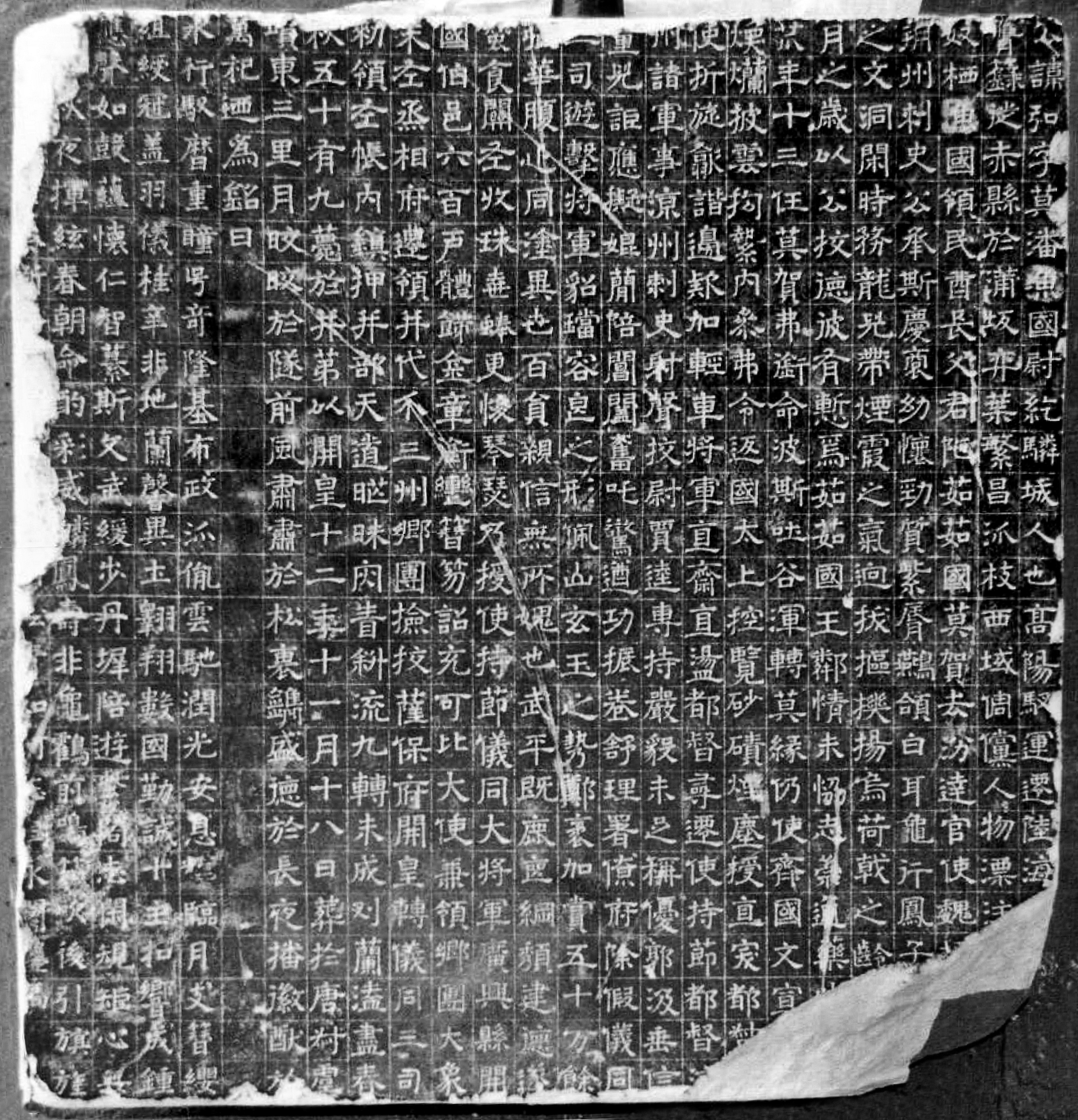
Epitaph of Yu Hong

The man buried in the tomb went by Yu Hong (Chinese: 虞弘; pinyin: Yú Hóng; Wade–Giles: Yü^{2} Hung^{2}; 533–592 AD), with Mopan (莫潘) as his courtesy name, who was a Central Asian, probably of Persian or Sogdian origin, and practiced Zoroastrianism. He had settled in Early Middle Period China during the Northern Qi, Northern Zhou and Sui dynasties. The epitaph found in the tomb records that he was a noble of the city of Yü-ho-lin / Yuhelin (尉紇驎) in the mysterious Yu country (魚國), assumably for which he is named, because the two characters 虞 and 魚 are homophones.

According to the epitaph, Yu Hong started his career in service of the nomadic tribe at the time, known as Ruru. At the age of 13, he was posted as an emissary to Persia by the Khagan of Ruru, as well as Parthia, Tuyuhun and Yuezhi. Later he went on a mission to the Northern Qi, Northern Zhou and Sui dynasties. He served as chien-chiao sa-pao fu / jianjiao sabao fu (檢校薩保府, lit. “acting director of the office of Zoroastrian affairs”, or “Sogdian affairs”) during the Northern Zhou period. The term sa-pao / sabao (薩保) comes from the Sogdian sārtpāw, means a “caravan leader”.

He had later served as a provincial governor in the Sui dynasty government, a chieftain of the Central Asian people who had settled in China during that period. Yu Hong died at the age of 59 in 592 AD. His wife survived him by six years, and was buried in the same grave in 598 AD.

A study on ancient DNA reveals that Yu Hong belonged to the haplogroup U5, one of the oldest western Eurasian-specific haplogroups, while his wife can be classified as haplogroup G, the type prevalent in East Asia.

Sogdian tombs in China are among the most lavish of the period in this country, and are only inferior to Imperial tombs, suggesting that the Sogdian Sabao were among the wealthiest members of the population.

== Tomb ==
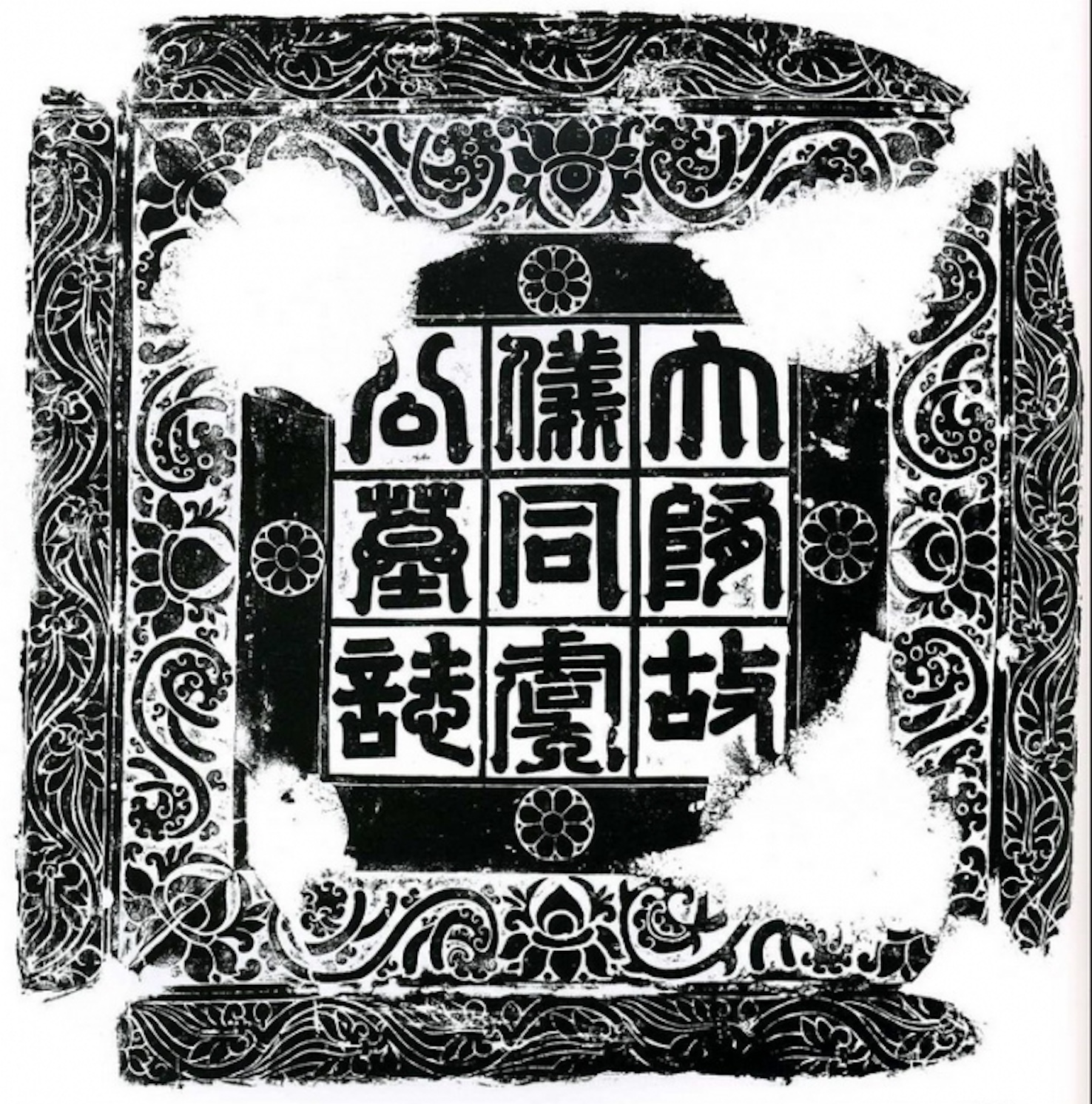
Rubbing of Yu Hong's epitaph cover, carved with nine characters in seal script.

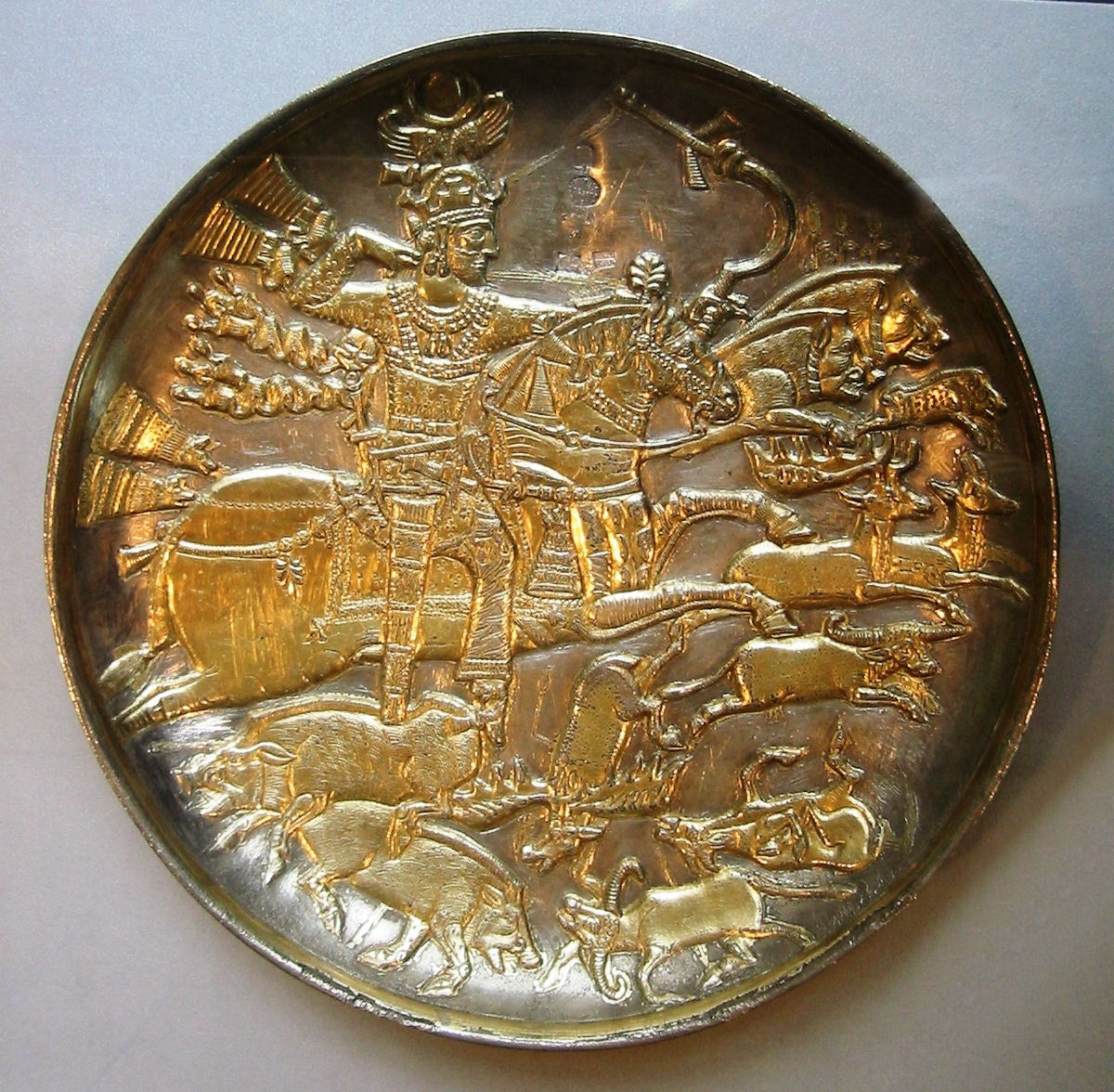
Hunting scene on a gilded silver plate showing Sasanian emperor Khosrow I, which shares similarities with the figures carved on Yu Hong's sarcophagus: the sun disc and crescent moon symbol, streamers flying behind headdress, position of riding figures, et cetera.

It is a single-chamber tomb of brick structure, composed of the tomb passageway, foyer, entrance and chamber. The entrance is almost entirely destroyed except for the lower part. Five octagonal marble pillars were found in the chamber, about 132 centimetres in height, two of which are intact, three are broken. Each one has a pillar foundation in the shape of an upturned lotus. A marble sarcophagus was located in the centre of the chamber.

Apart from the marble pillars and sarcophagus, the tomb has yielded human figurines in stone, horse figurines in pottery, white porcelain bowls, two epitaph covers and stones, et cetera, amounting to more than 80 pieces. The central part of the epitaph cover for Yu Hong is taken up by nine characters in relief in seal script, it reads “Epitaph of Master Yu of the Great Sui, formerly unequalled in Honour” (大隋故儀同虞公墓誌).

== Sarcophagus ==
The sarcophagus is made up of white marble, it assumes the appearance of a temple with the hip-and-gable roof. It is composed of three parts: the rectangular platform, walls in the middle section and the roof. The sarcophagus rested on a support platform, at each side of the platform there are two stone supports in the form of a lion's head. The entire sarcophagus stands in 2.17 metres in height.

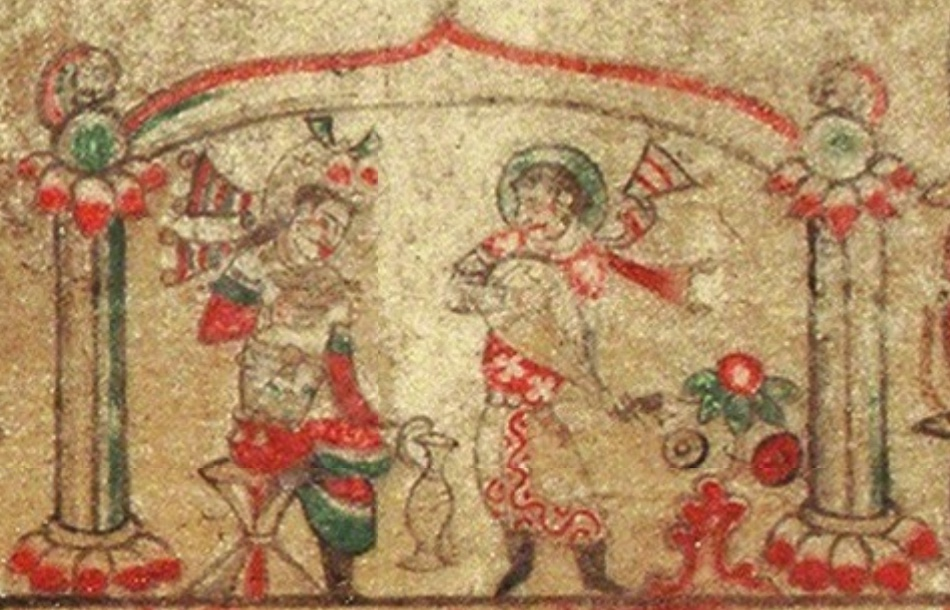
Detail of the stone panel painting on the sarcophagus, depicting two nimbate male figures dressing in Sasanian-style attire, drinking wine and playing pipa.

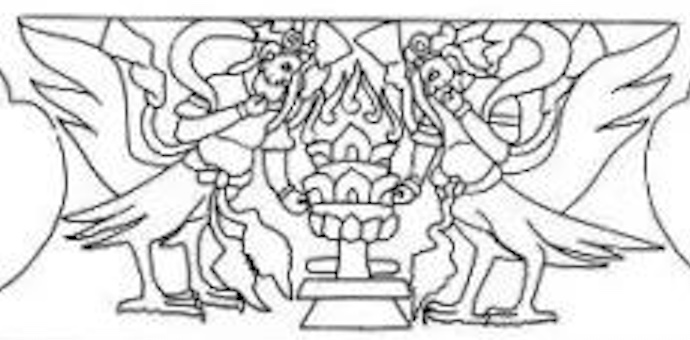
Fire altar scene on the sarcophagus

It is covered with bas-reliefs and painted stone panels, comprising 54 scenes, featuring motifs of Central Asian or Persian origin, such as the costumes, vessels, musical instruments and dances. They depict banqueting, dancing, hunting, among others. As can be seen in the reliefs Yu Hong hunting with nomads on horses, camels, but also hunting on an Indian elephant. In addition, numerous Zoroastrian symbols are clearly displayed: the holy fire on a lotus, guarded by two priests half-bird, half-human wearing the traditional padam (a piece of cloth) in front of them and also including a portrayal of Mithra wearing a Sasanian crown, which decorated with the typical symbol of a solar disc resting on crescent moon. The figures in these reliefs all have deep-set eyes and beak nose.

The nine main bas-reliefs are the large-size pieces (panels) carved in marble and originally painted in gold (gilded), red and brown pigments, on the exterior of the front right and left walls, and on the interior of the right, rear and left walls. They can be divided into two groups: the first group consists of four pieces, which may depict some scenes from Yu Hong's daily life; the rest may represent his afterlife in paradise. Each panel is divided into a larger upper part and a smaller lower part.

=== Description of the relief panels ===
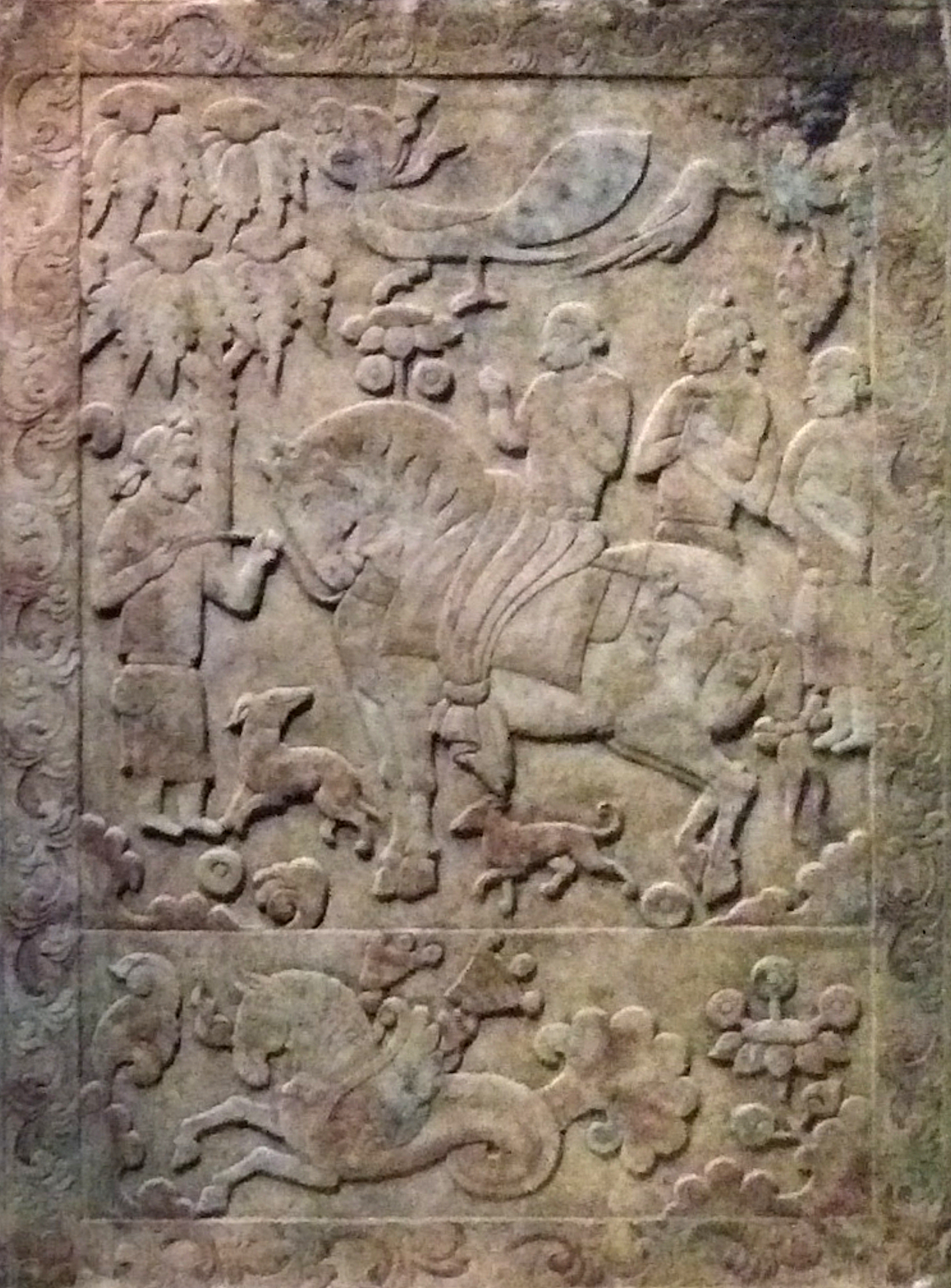
Panel 1

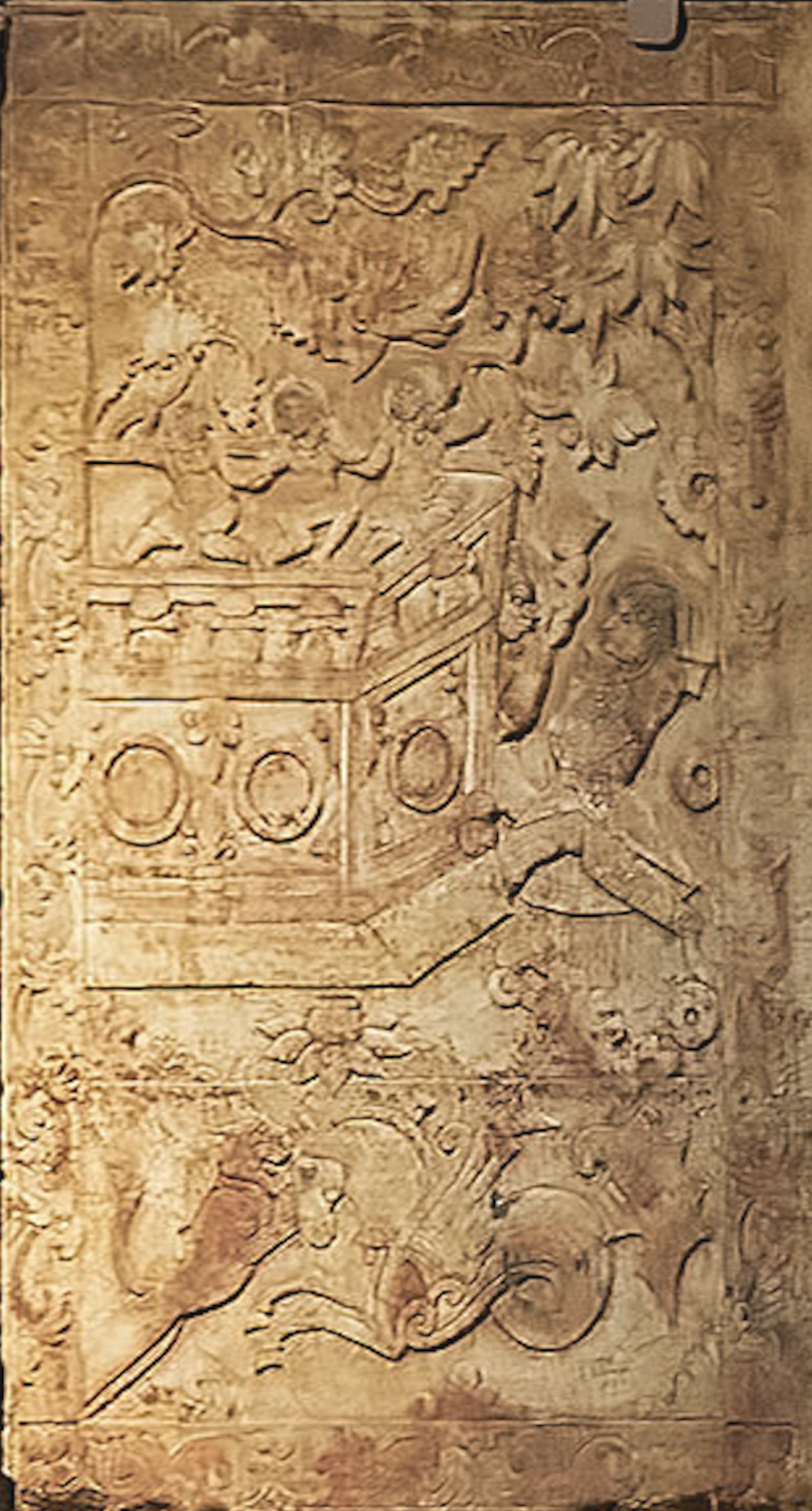
Panel 2

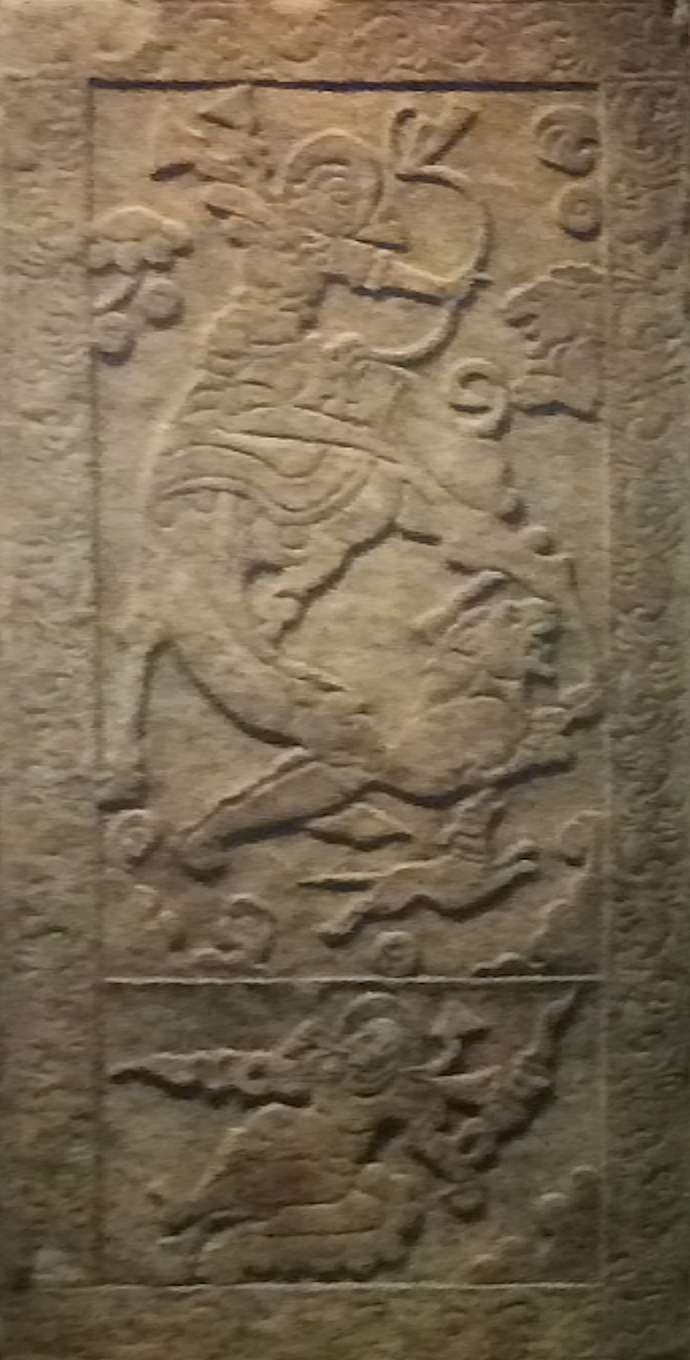
Panel 3

- Panel 1: the upper part features a man riding on a horse with another man leading the horse and two men standing behind. They all wear gowns with round collars and narrow sleeves, accompanied by two dogs and two birds. The larger bird has a halo that surrounds its head. The lower part features a galloping, winged merhorse.
- Panel 2: the upper part features a hexagonal platform with a balustrade, three men parallel to one another dancing in the balustrade. To the right of the platform are two men. The platform partially hides the man on the left from view, the man on the right is holding in his hands a large jar with legs similar to “wheel-o-feet”. A bird can be seen flying among the grapevines. The lower part features a fighting scene between a male lion and a merhorse.
- Panel 3: the upper part features a man with a halo on camel-back killing a lion. The lower part features another haloed man sitting on a cushion with a floral border, his right hand guilding a horned vessel to his mouth.

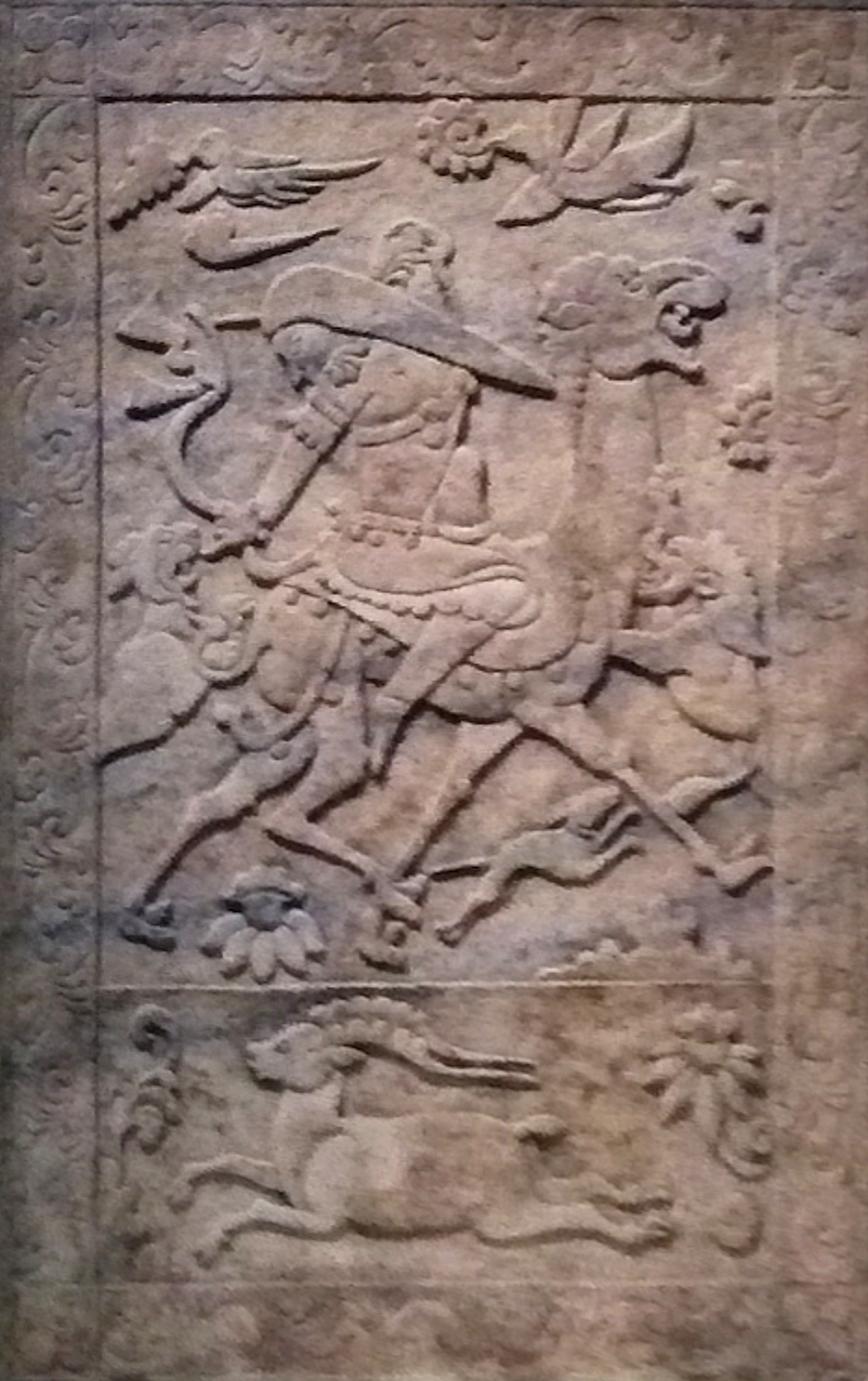
Panel 4

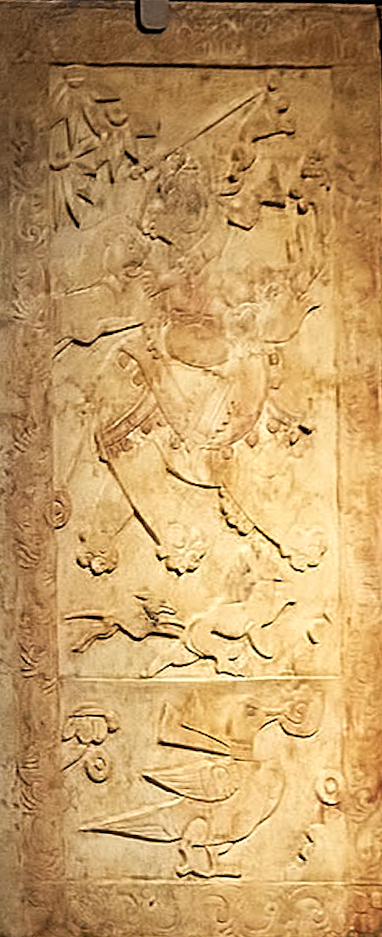
Panel 6

- Panel 4: the upper part features a scene of lion hunting on camel-back. The rider is turning his head back to look down on a male lion behind which he is about to kill. The lower part features an antelope racing through meadows.

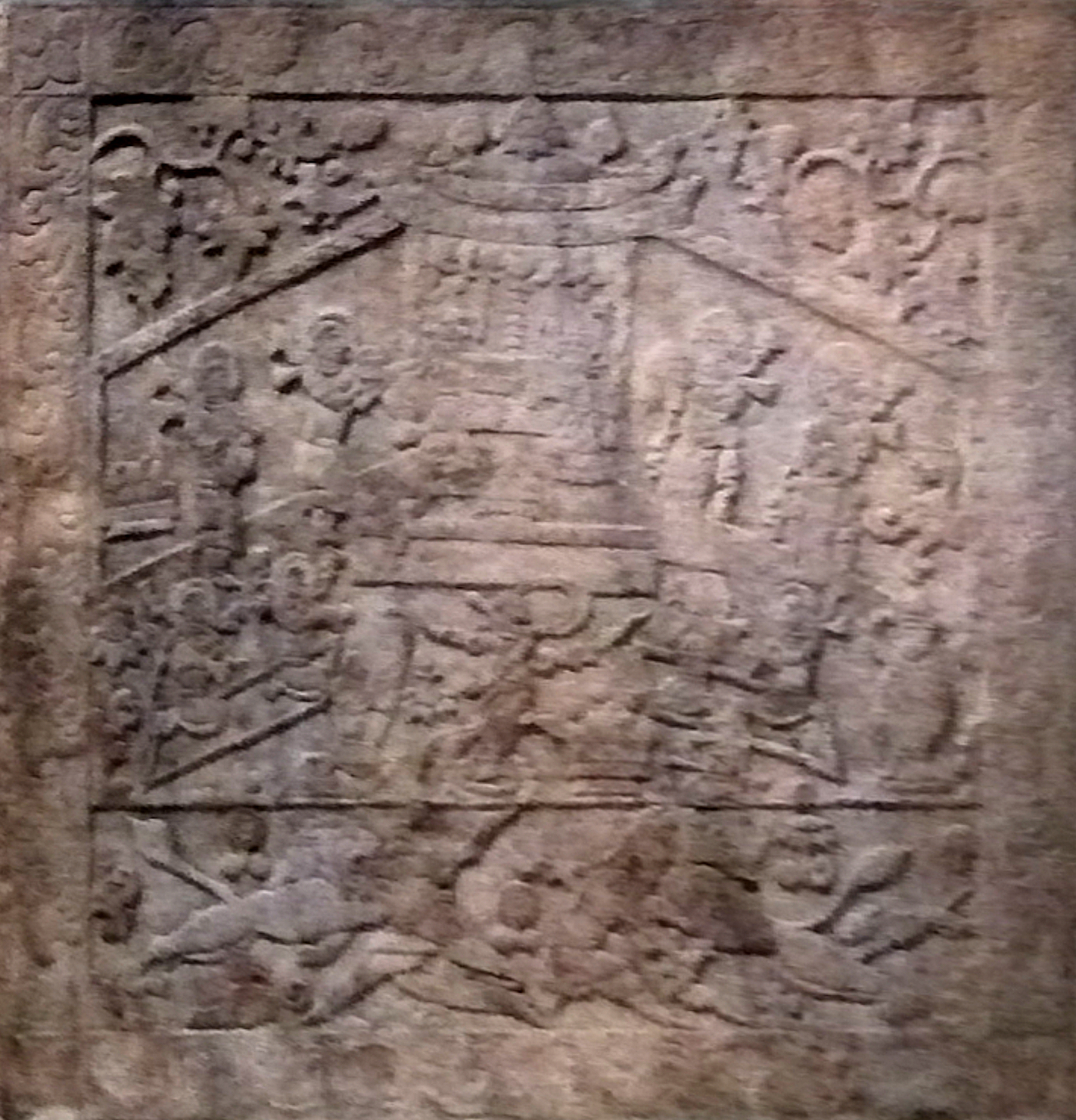
Tomb of Yu Hong, panel 5.

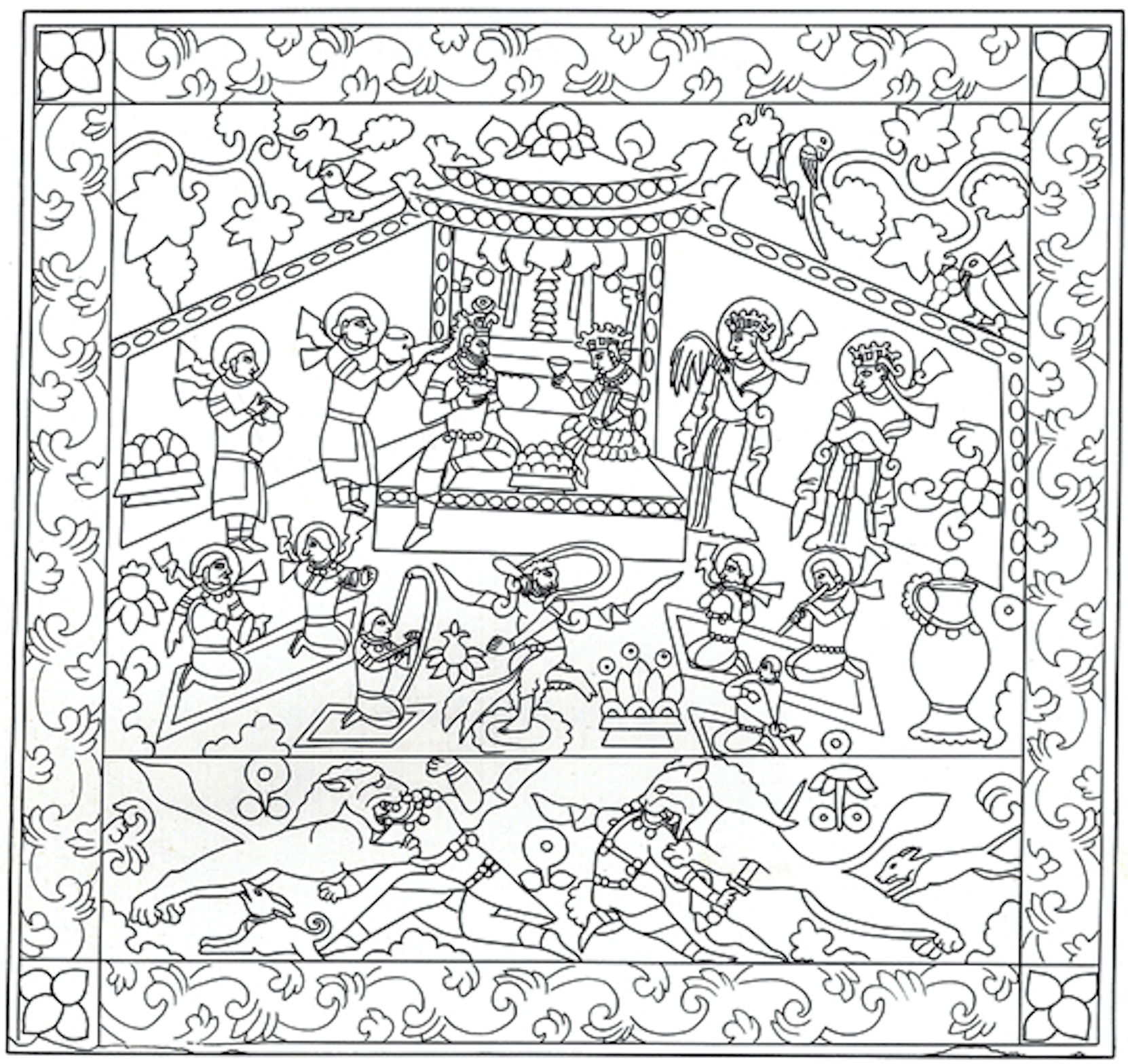
Line drawing copy of panel 5.

- Panel 5: This piece is in the middle section of the rear wall, facing the gate of the sarcophagus. It is the largest among the nine panels with the most complex scene. The upper part features a rear half of a large felt tent, inside the tent there is a stone bed on which are sitting a man on the left and a woman on the right. The man with deep-set eyes, beak nose and thick beard, wearing a headdress with the symbol of a sun disc resting on crescent moon on the top and streamers flying behind, which is quite similar to the Sasanian crown. He is holding a bowl at chest height with his right hand and looking at the woman. The woman is in a cross-legged sitting position, facing the man. She wears a coronet and holding a long stem goblet in her right hand. There are two male attendants behind the man and two female ones behind the woman. In front, there is a spacious clearing, on the right and left sides of which are six male musicians in a half-kneeling position. A man dancing the Hu-tʻêng / Huteng dance at the centre, which is a type of dance originally from the Western Regions, characterised by leaps and back flips. It was considered an exotic performance form together with the Sogdian Whirl dance at the time. The lower part is a fighting scene between two men and two lions. This relief has long been considered depicting Yu Hong and his wife enjoying a banquet, Bi Bo, an associate professor of the School of Chinese Classics at Renmin University of China, however, argues that the female figure is not Yu Hong's wife but rather a representation of Daēnā, a Zoroastrian divinity. It actually depicts Yu Hong enjoying a heavenly feast in his afterlife.
- Panel 6: the upper part features a man killing a lion on elephant back. The lower part is a large bird (probably a dove?) with a silk ribbon tied around its neck and holding a stylised cloud in its beak.

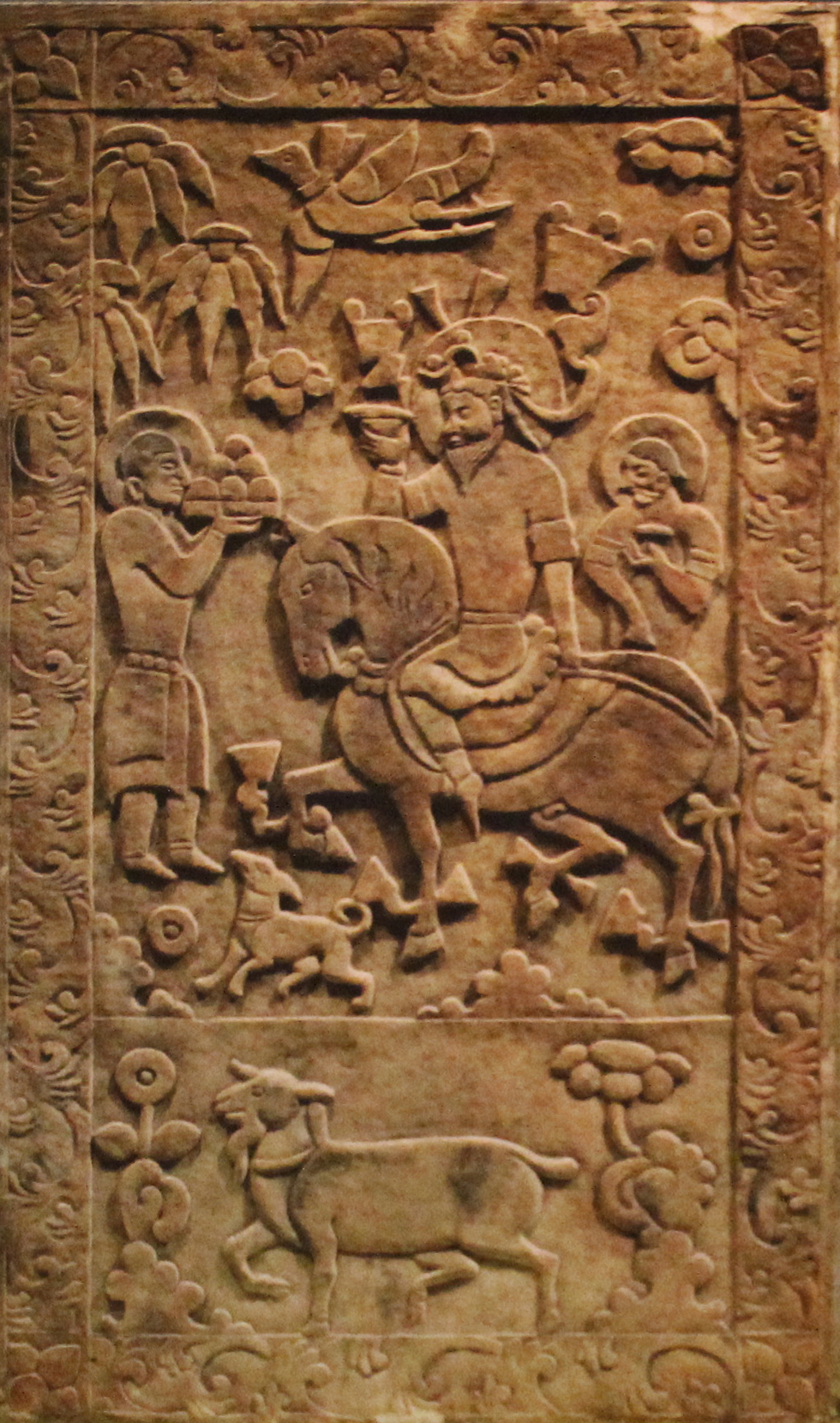
Panel 7

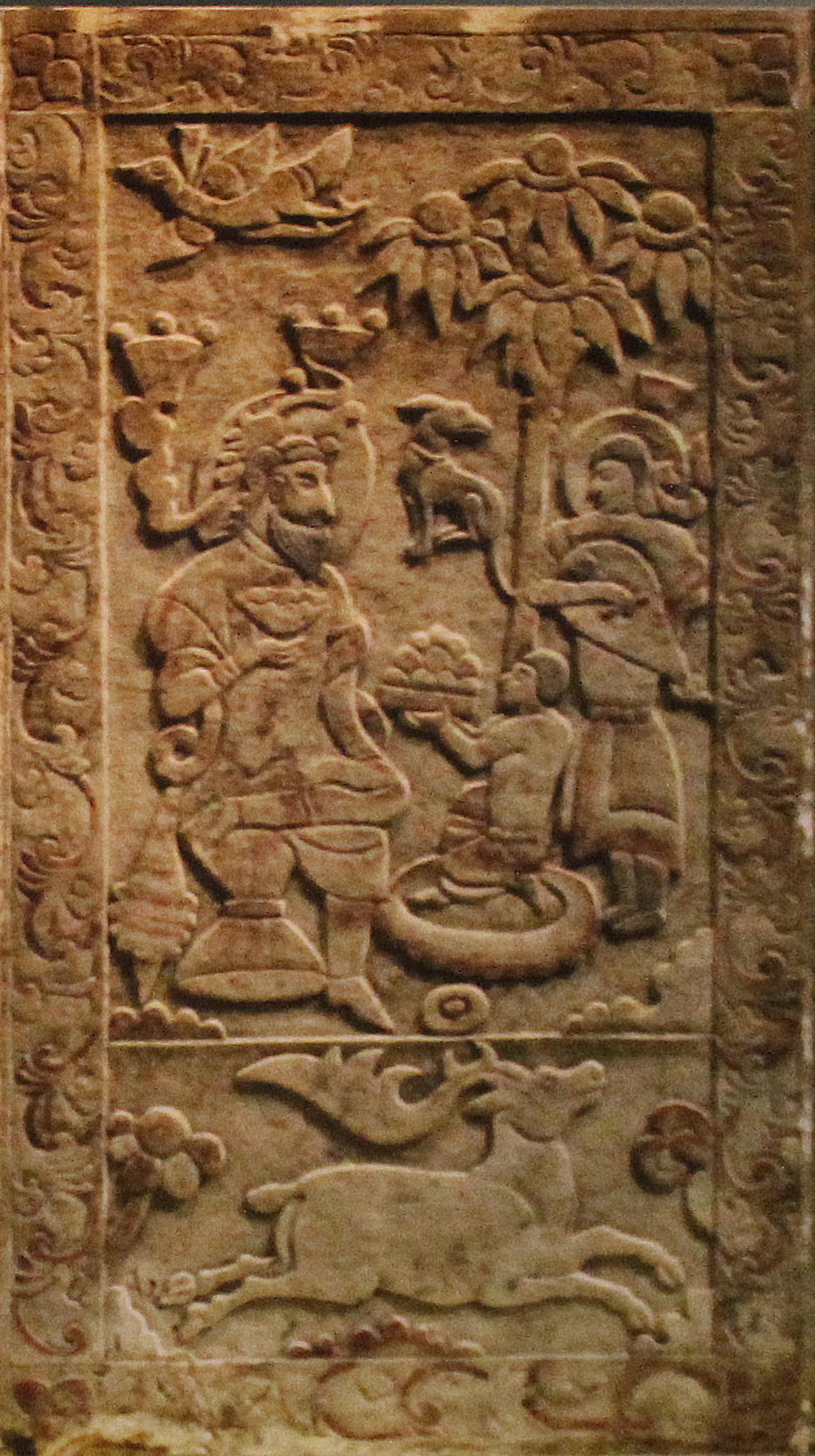
Panel 8

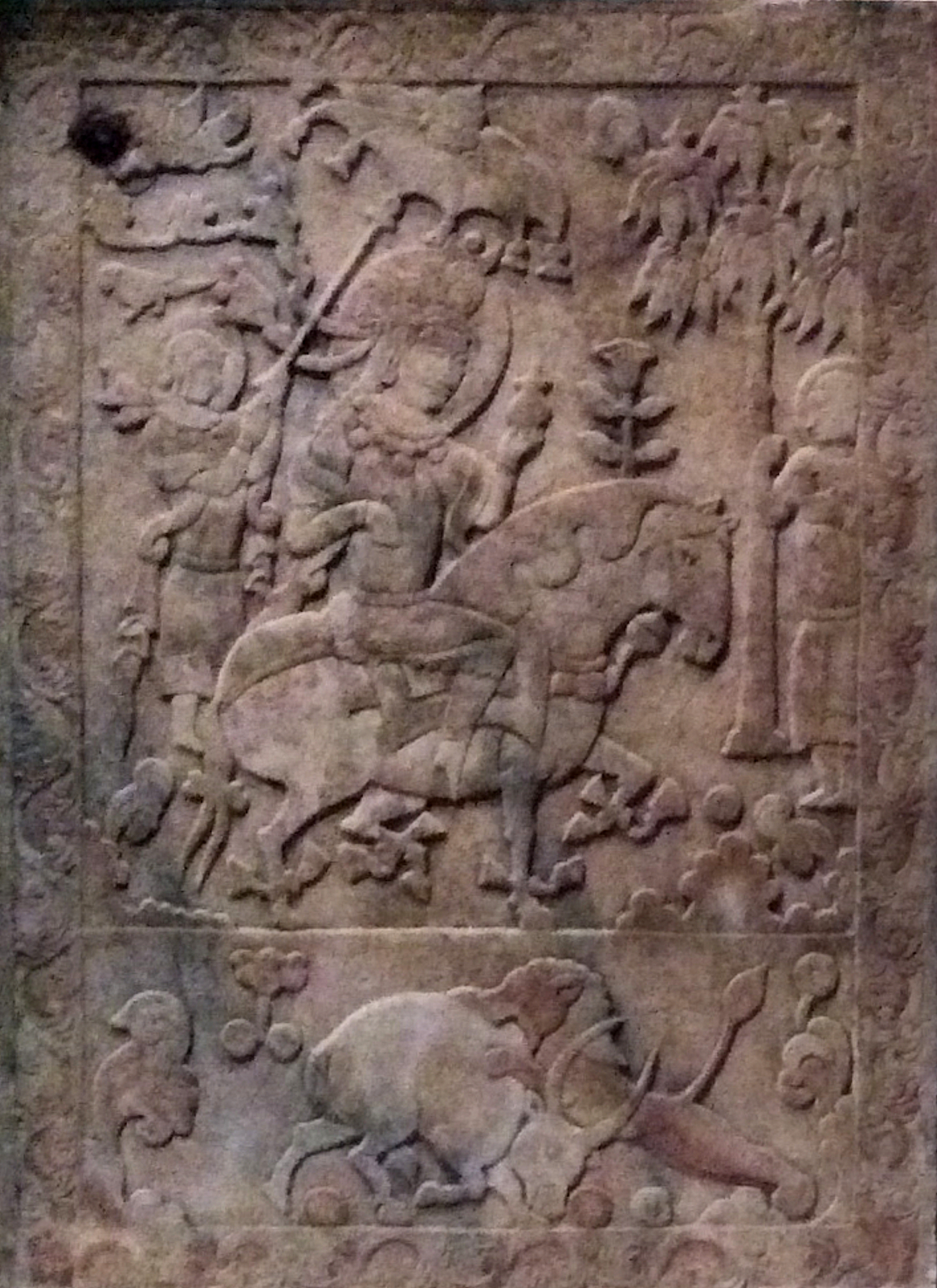
Panel 9

- Panel 7: the upper part features three haloed men (one of them is riding a horse) taking a rest on their journey. The man on horseback wears a bejewelled crown, he is rising a cup in his left hand. The two attendants are standing in front and behind the horse, the one in front is offering a plate of fruits to the master. The lower part features a white goat.
- Panel 8: the upper part features the master with a bejewelled crown from the seventh panel is sitting on a chair and holding a long stem goblet. Two attendants are in front of the master, one is offering a plate of fruits, the other is playing pipa. The lower part features a running white reindeer.
- Panel 9: the upper part features a rider wearing a Persian crown decorated with the typical symbol of a sun disc resting on crescent moon, a necklace, a gown with round collar and tight sleeves. On his feet is a pair of white boots. An attendant stands behind the rider's horse, holding a canopy (similar to an umbraculum or a baldachin, but smaller). In front of the horse is a man carrying a plate of fruit. The lower part features a fighting scene between a bull and a lion. The rider depicted in this panel is possibly a representation of Mithra.

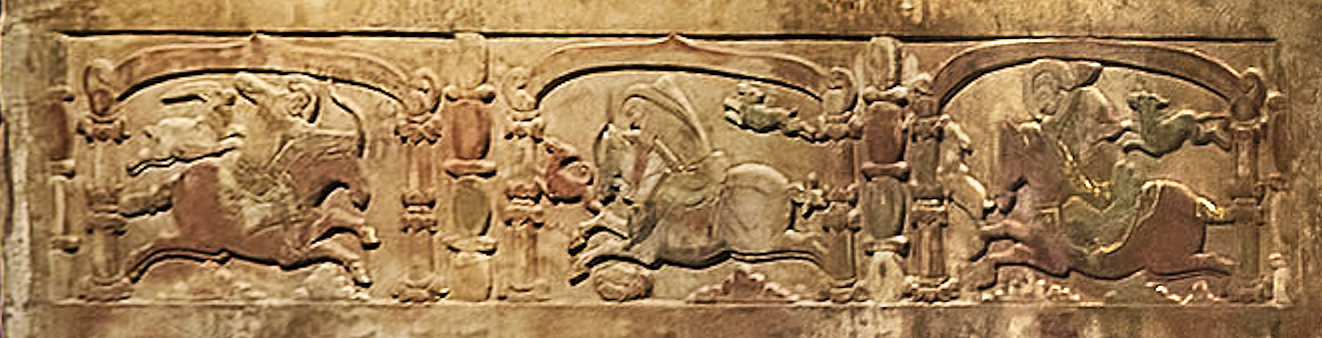
Tomb of Yu Hong, hunting scenes (below panels 2 and 3)

== Gallery ==
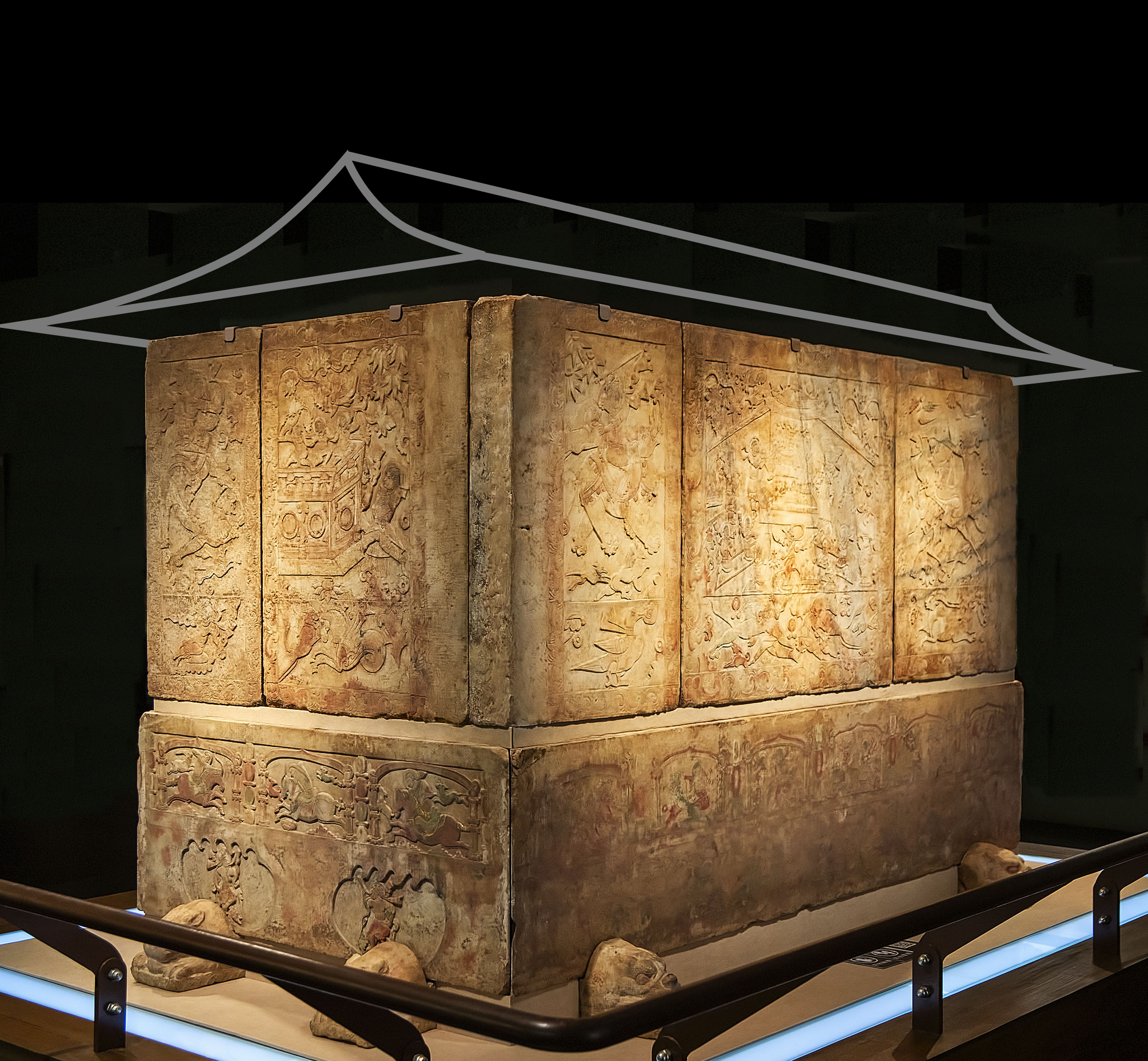
Tomb of Yu Hong with original roof (simulation)

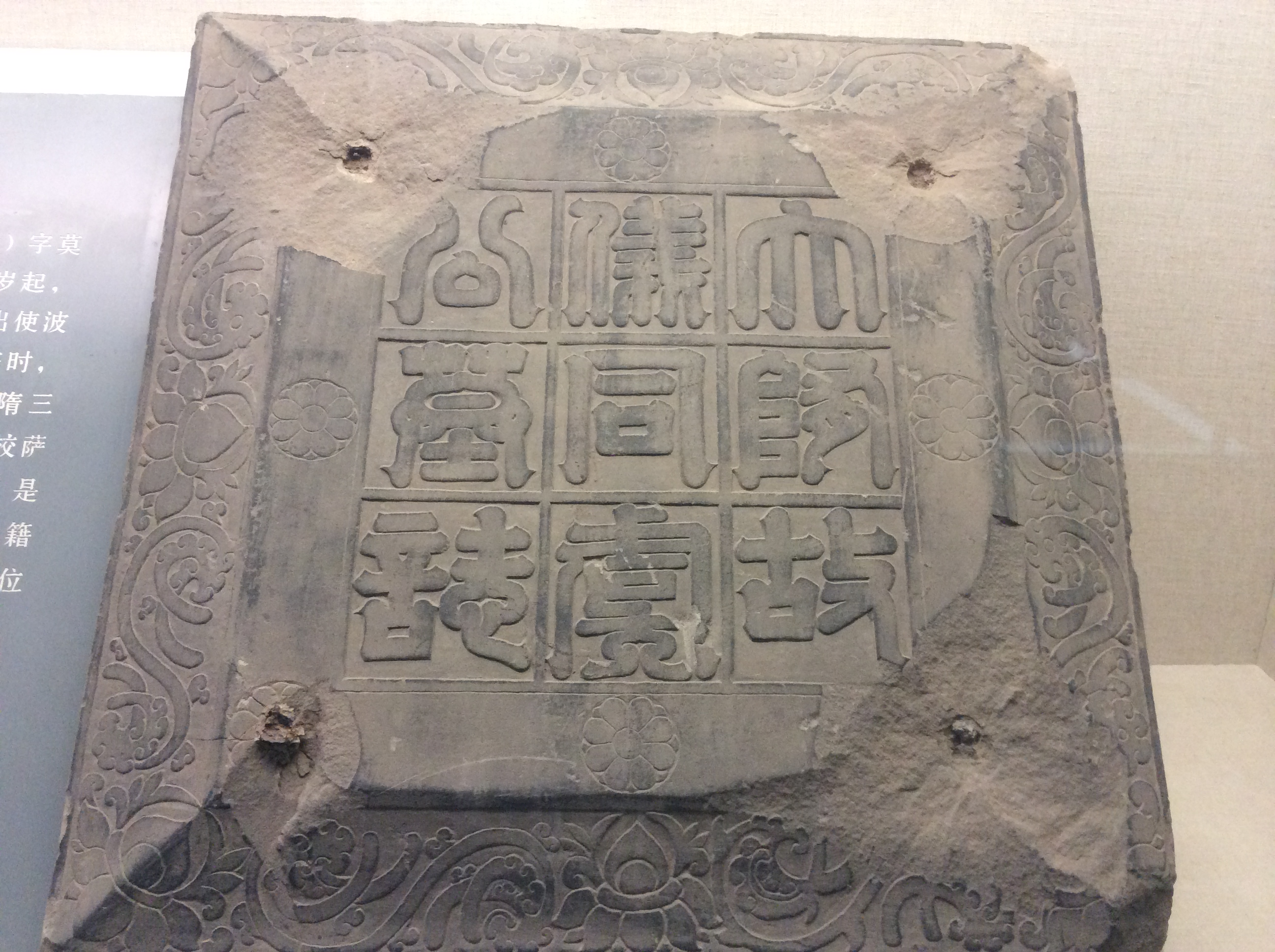
The epitaph cover of Yu Hong

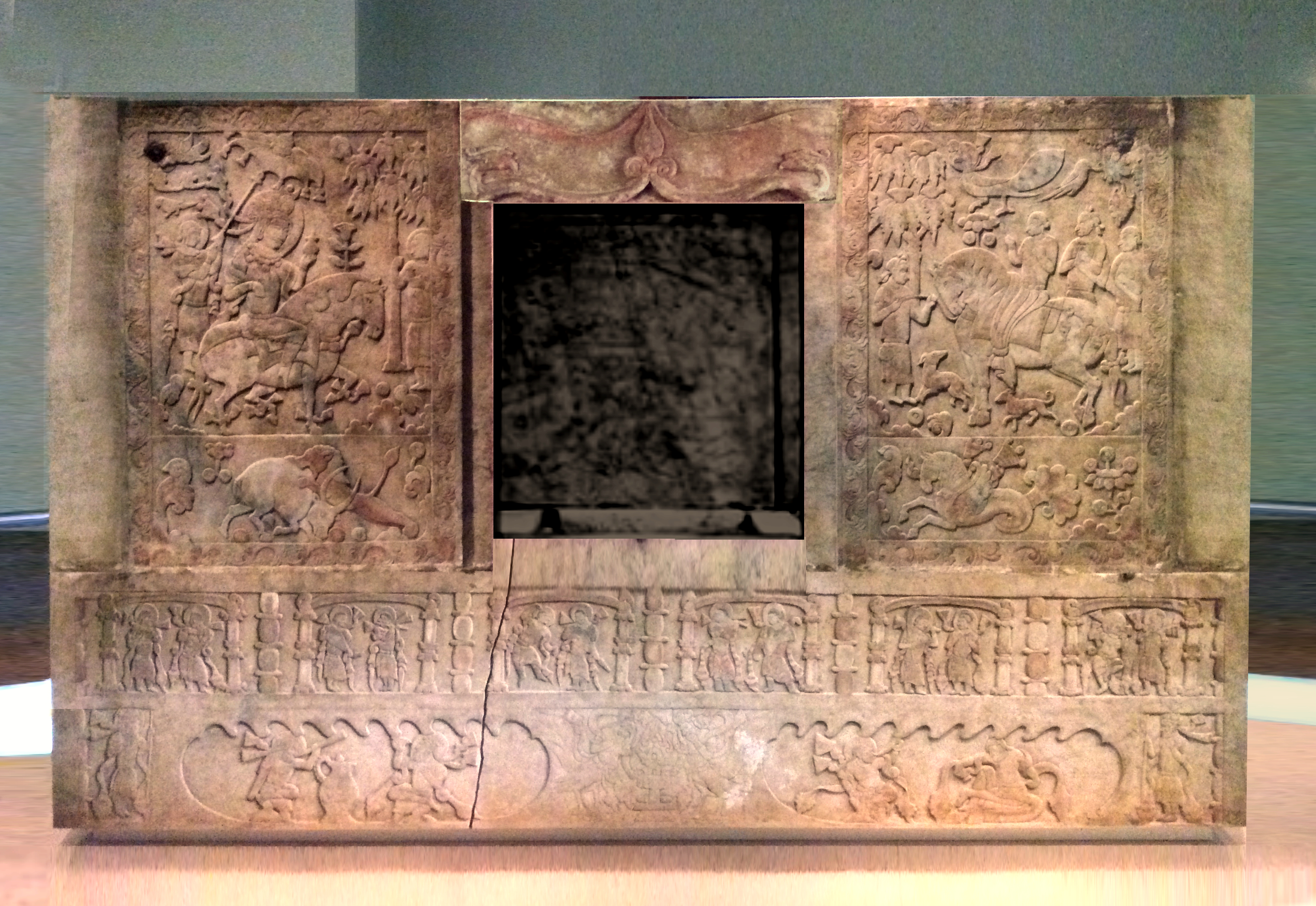
The front of the sarcophagus, panel 9 on the left and panel 1 on the right

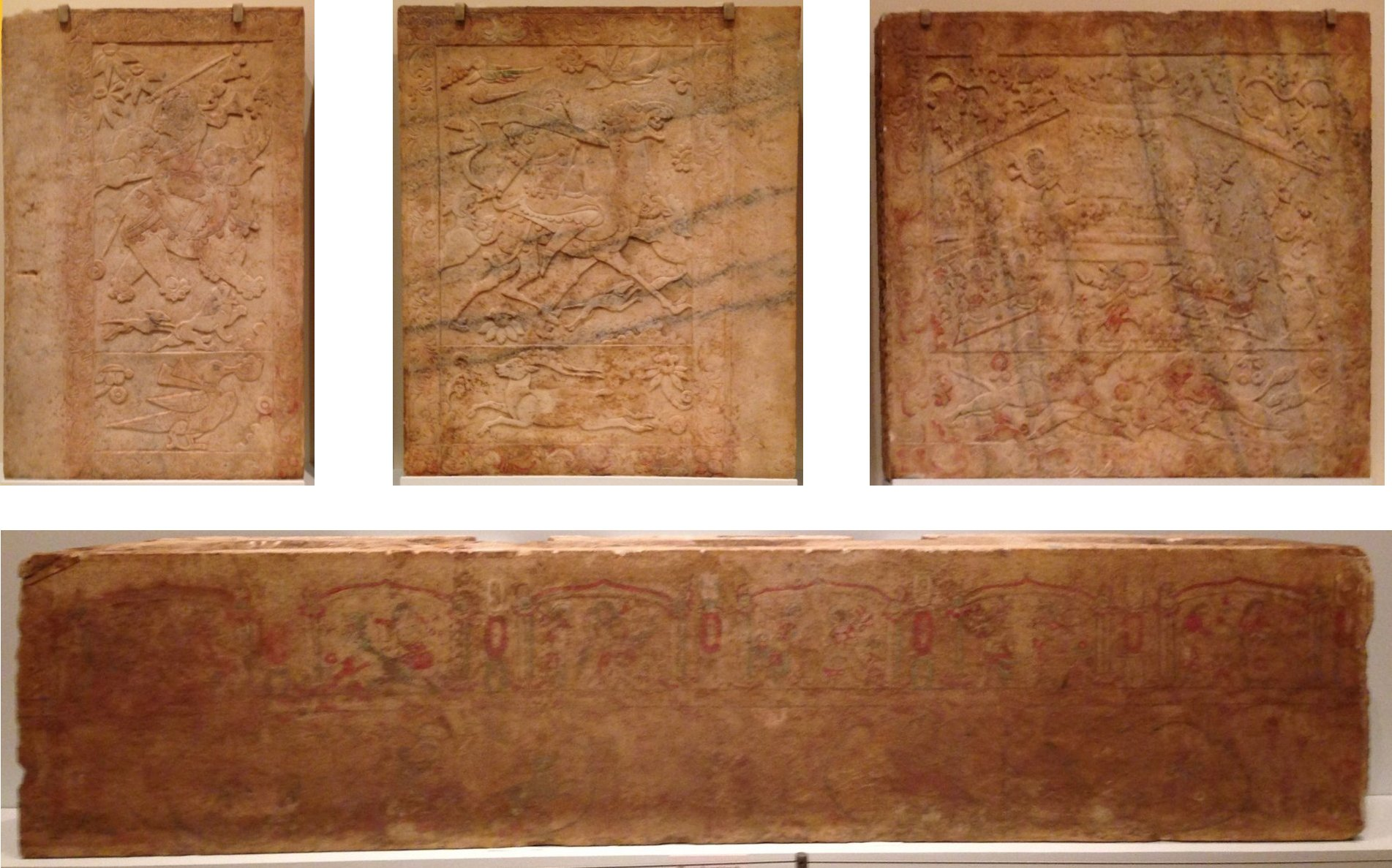
Bas-reliefs panel 6, panel 4, panel 5 and the painted stone panel

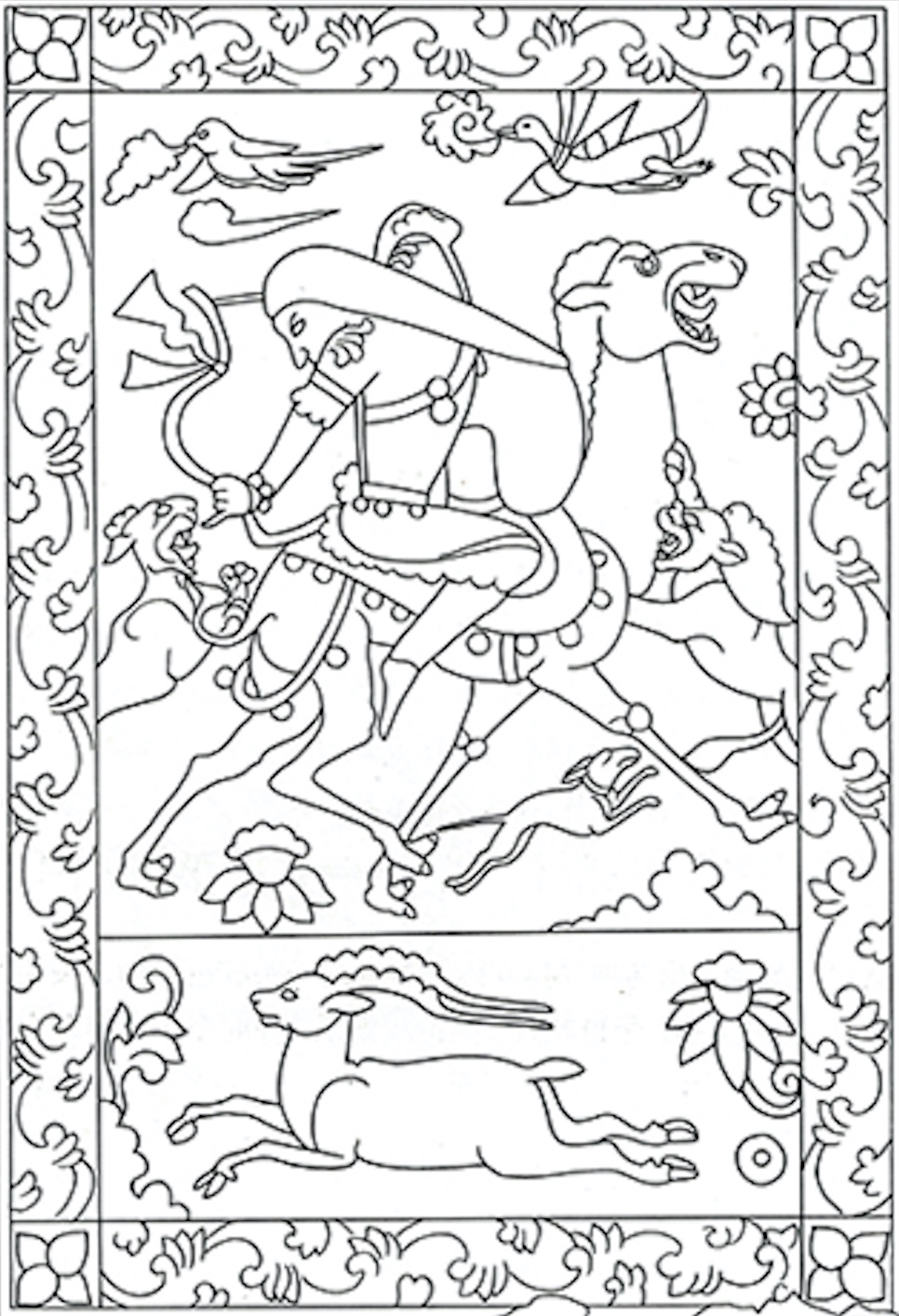
Line drawing copy of the panel 4

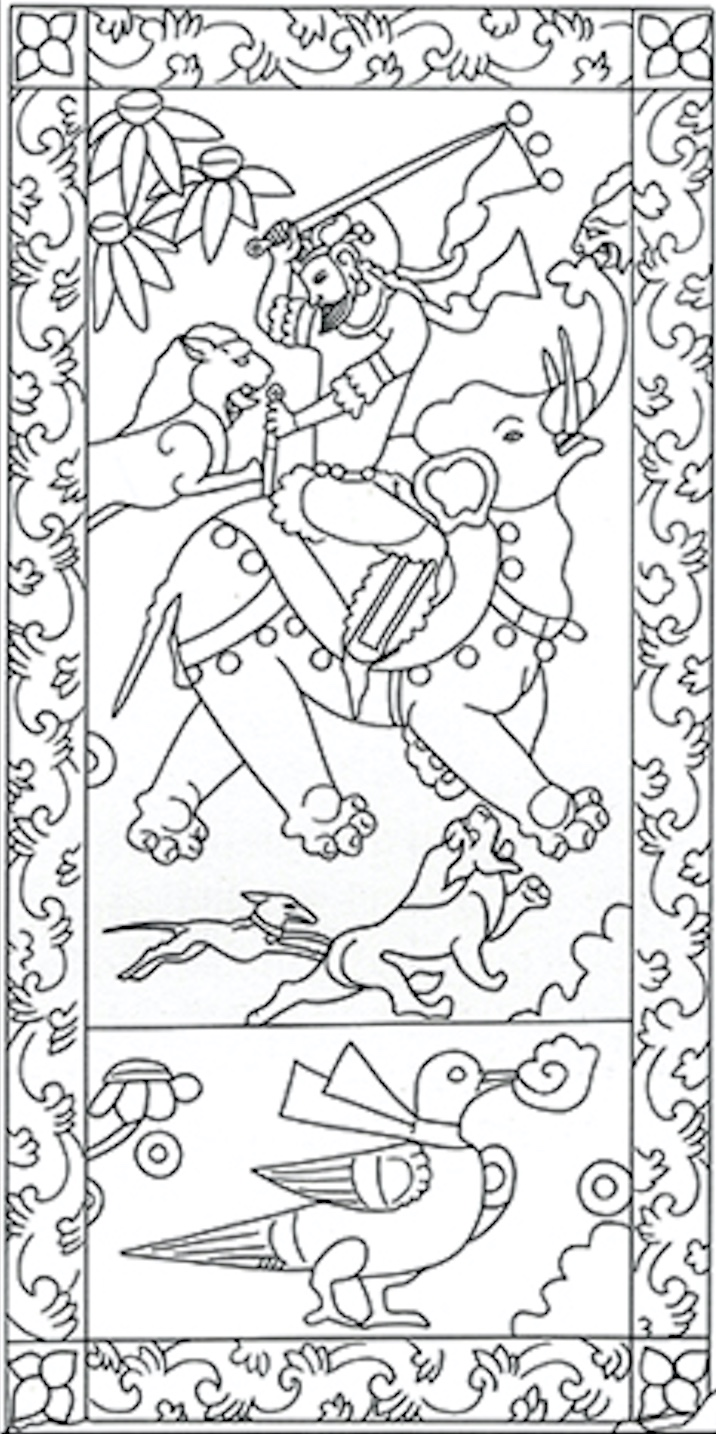
Line drawing copy of the panel 6

The painted stone panel

These paintings are on the rear side of the sarcophagus platform.

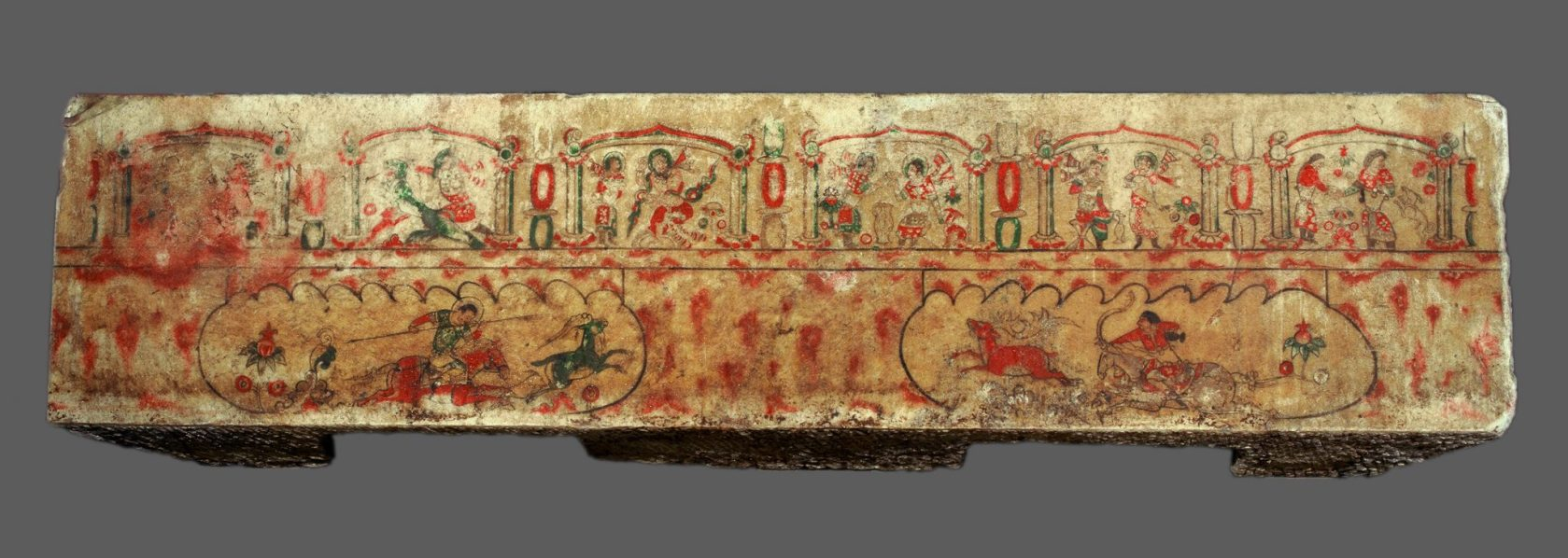
The sarcophagus platform panel

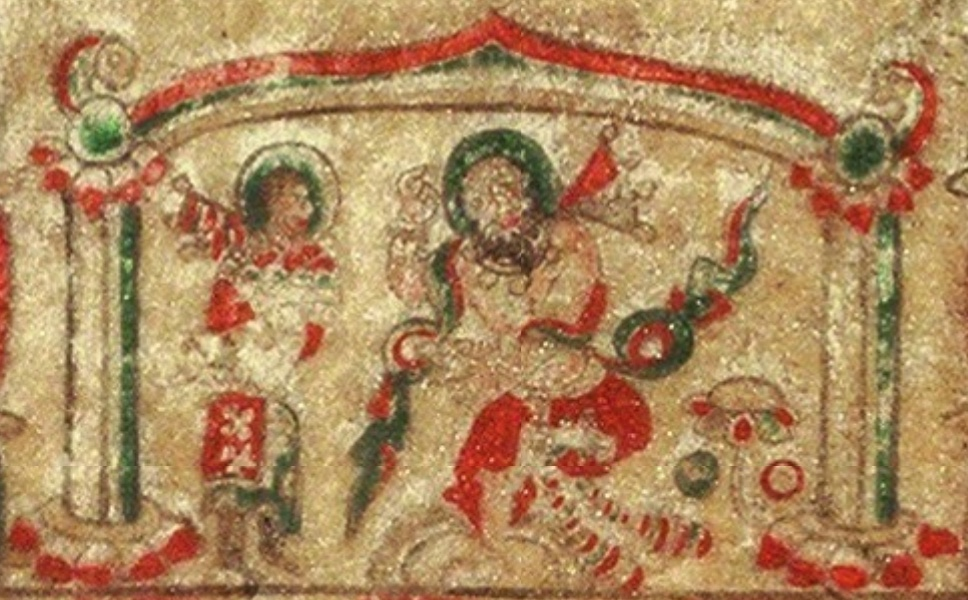
Left: a man holding a plate of fruits; right: a bearded man is performing the Huteng dance. Both figures have haloes.

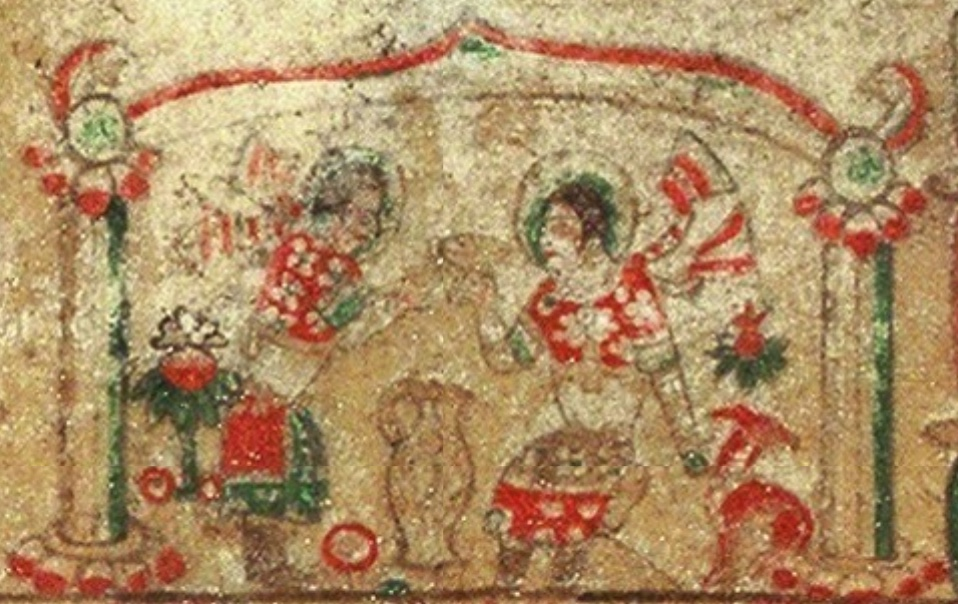
Two nimbate male figures are making a toast

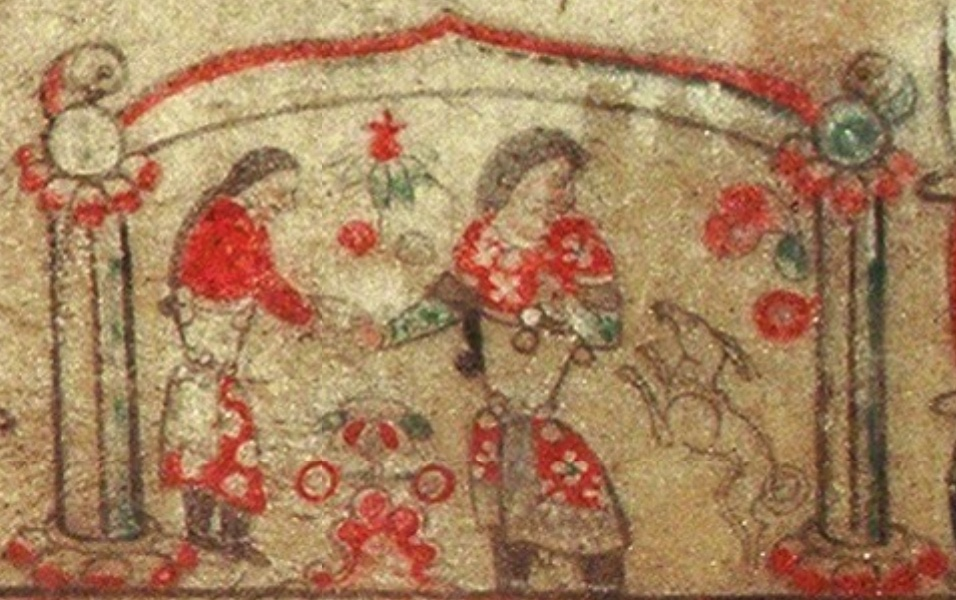
Another drinking scene

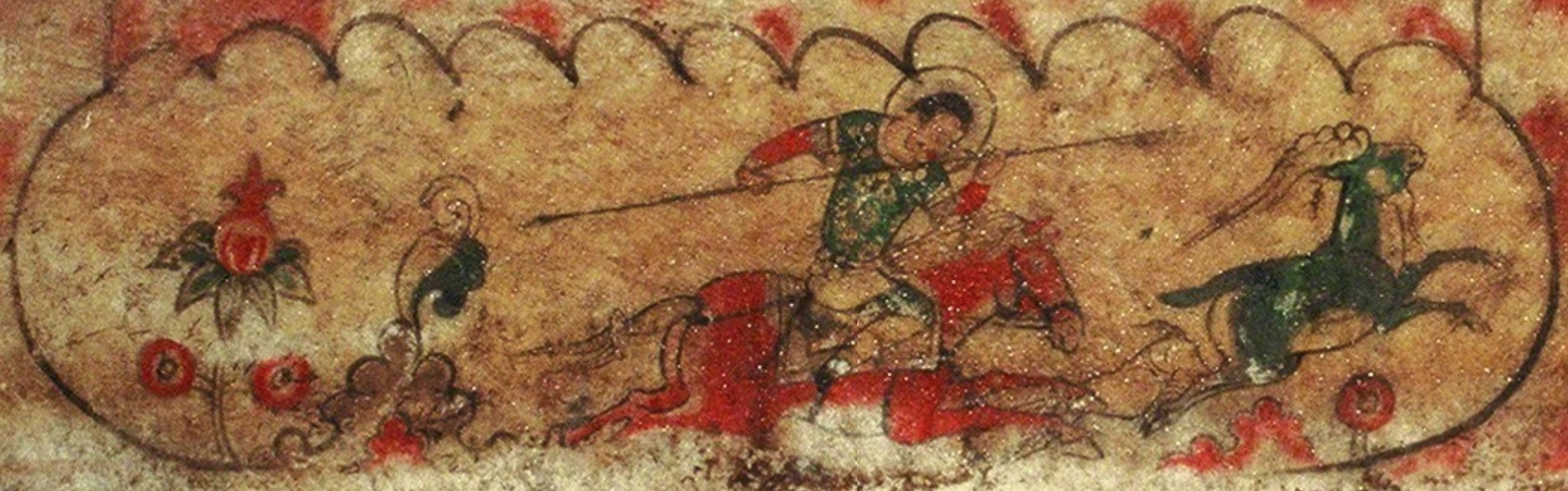
A nimbate male figure hunting a green goat

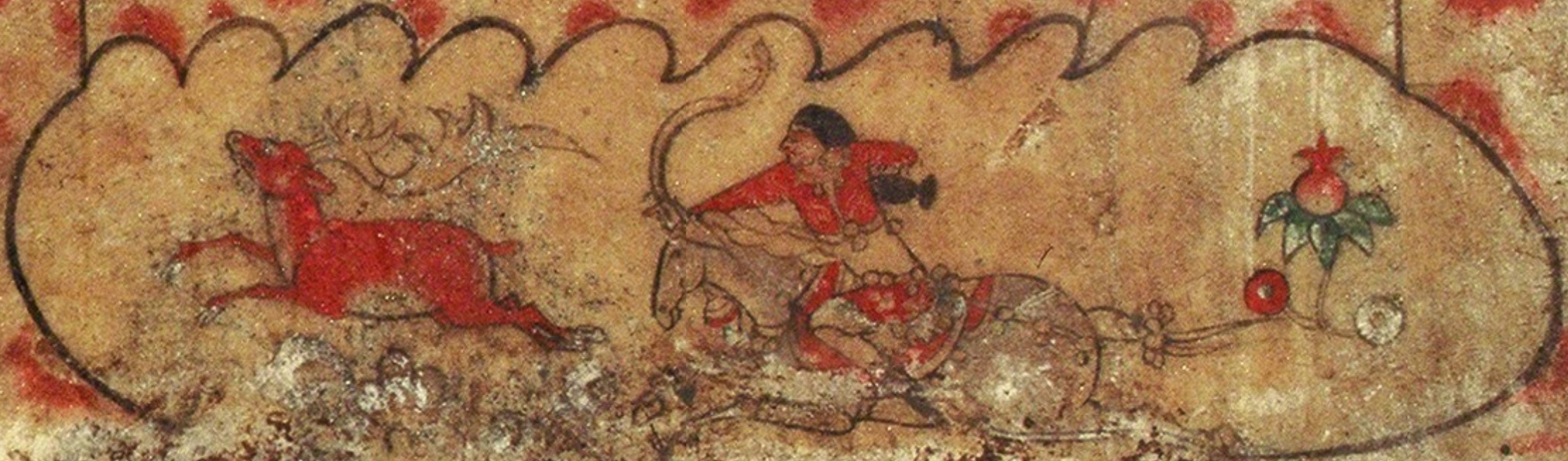
A male figure hunting a red deer

== See also ==
- Tomb of Wirkak
- Iranians in China
- Huteng dance
- Sasanian art
- Tomb of An Jia
- Tomb of Kang Ye
