= Huteng =

Chinese term for a type of dance

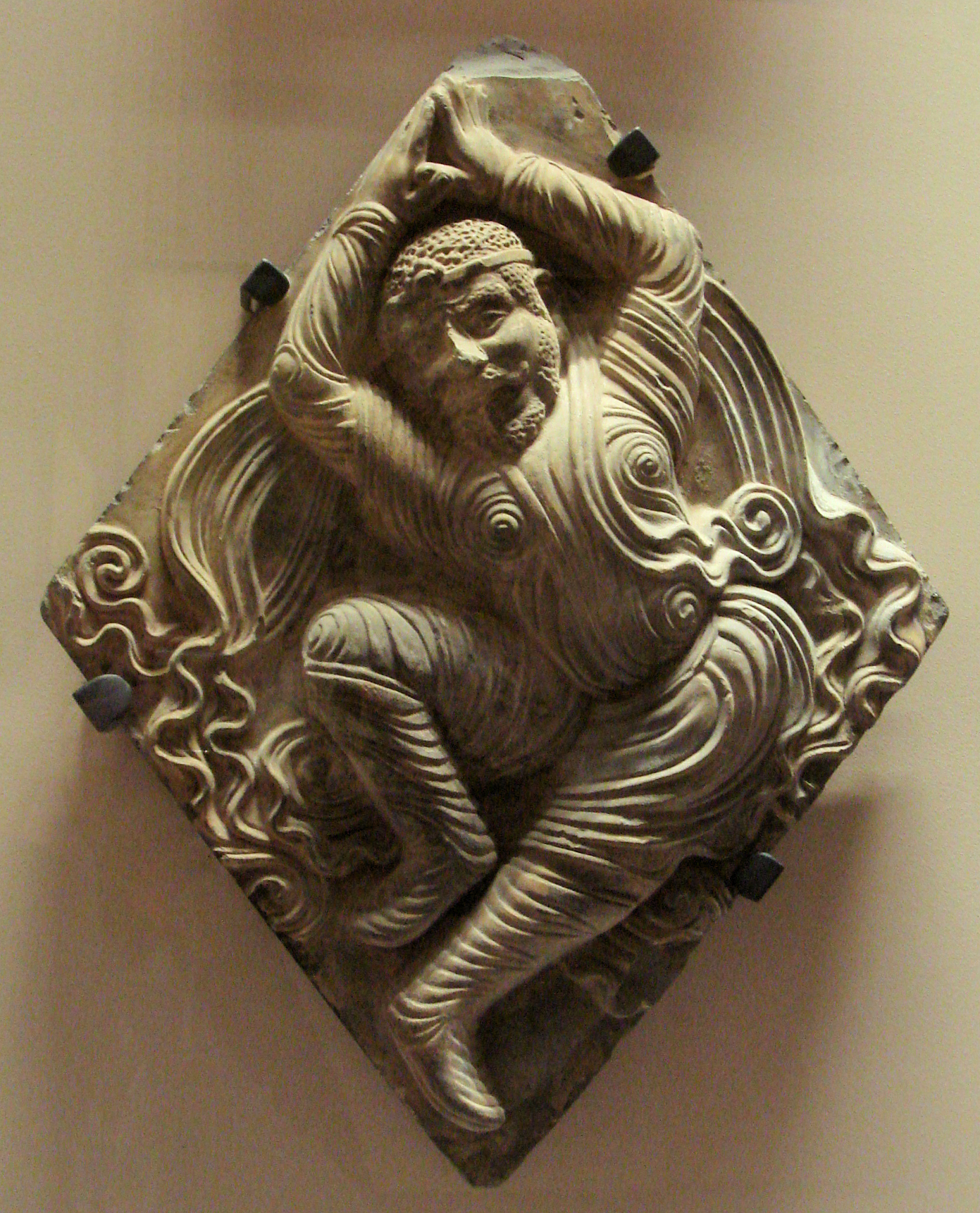
Sogdian Huteng dancer, Xiuding temple pagoda, Anyang, Henan, China, Tang dynasty, 7th century.

Huteng (simplified Chinese: 胡腾; traditional Chinese: 胡騰; pinyin: Húténg; lit. 'Barbaric leap', also 胡腾舞, Húténgwǔ, "Dance of the Barbaric leap") was the Chinese term for a type of dance that originated in Central Asia, especially among the Sogdians and the region of Tashkent (石國, Shíguó). The dance was well known during the Tang dynasty, and there are numerous depictions of it in works of art. The dance was characterized by spinning, leaps and backflips. The dancers would particularly make somersaults, first planting their feet firmly on the carpet, tilting their face upward and arching their body, then lift their arms and jump backward to the sound of flutes and the pipa.

Another famous dance from Central Asia was the Sogdian Whirl (胡旋, Húxuăn, "Whirling Barbarians", also 胡旋舞, Húxuănwǔ, "Dance of the Whirling Barbarians". but known as "Sogdian Whirl dance" or simply "Sogdian whirl" to Western scholars), in which a young woman was spinning inside a circle. Also another one was the "Dance of the thorn branch" (柘枝舞, Zhèzhīwŭ).

These dances, part of the "Barbaric dances" (胡舞, Húwŭ) from Central Asia, Serindia and the Persian Empire, were extremely popular in China during the Tang dynasty, especially in the area of Chang'an and Luoyang.

The representations of foreigners would turn more negative after the 8th century CE, following the revolt of An Lushan, a Turco-Iranian rebel.

== Gallery ==
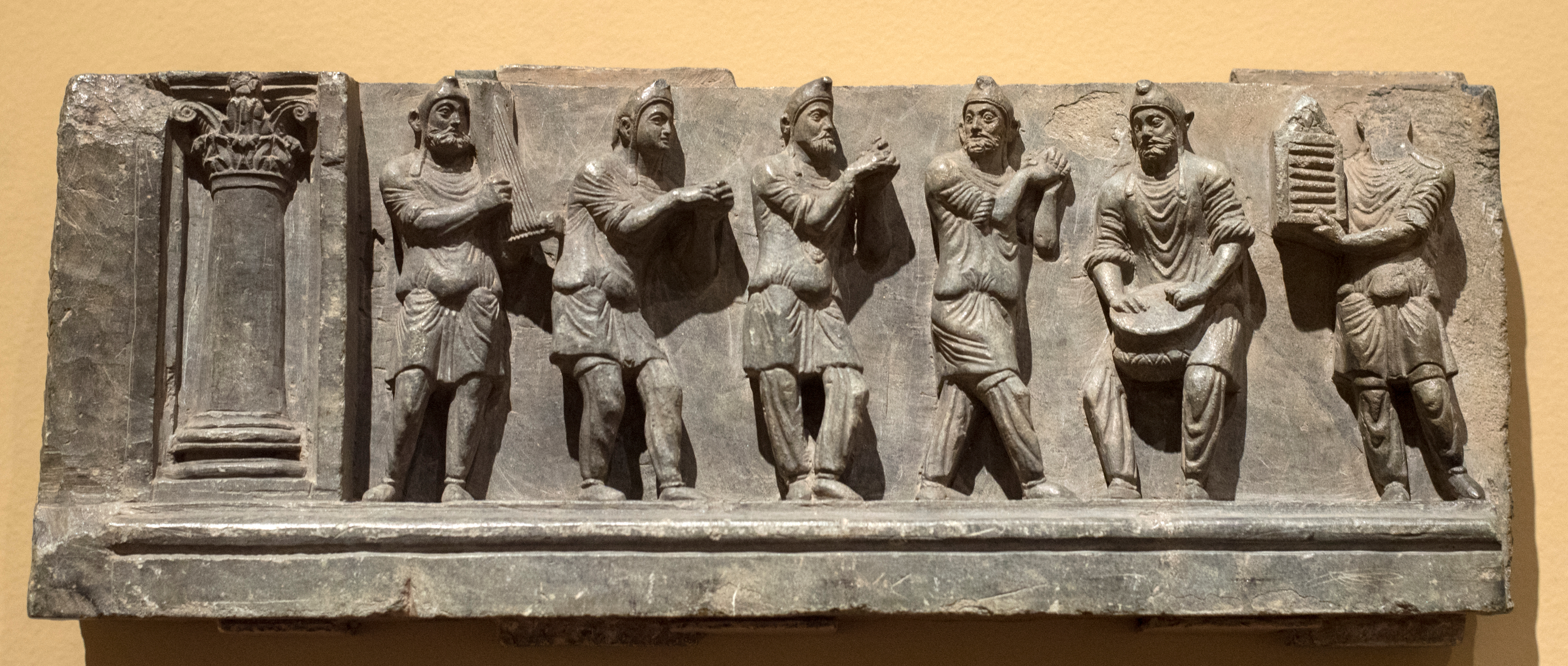
Indo-Scythian dancers, Buner reliefs, Gandhara, 1st-2nd century CE.

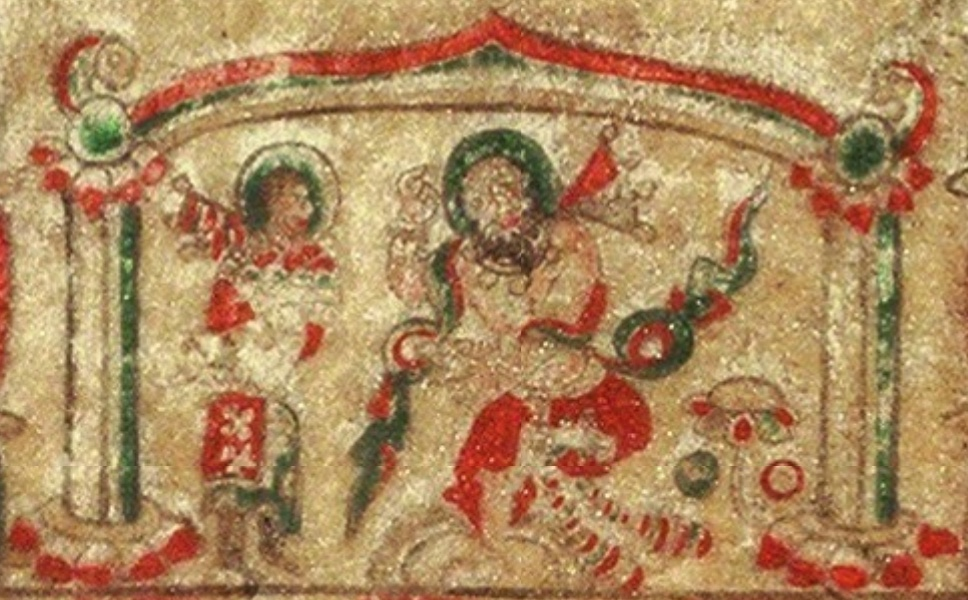
Left: a man holding a plate of fruits; right: a bearded man is performing the Huteng dance. Both figures have haloes. Tomb of Yu Hong, 6th century CE.

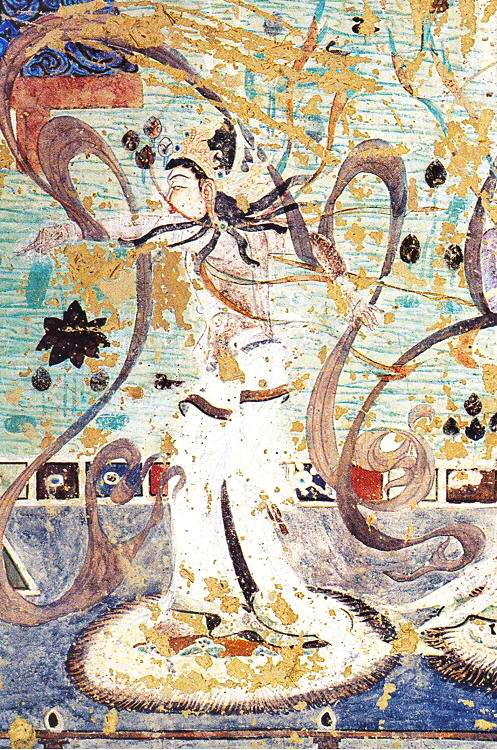
Cave 220 “Huxuan” dancer in mural from Mogao.

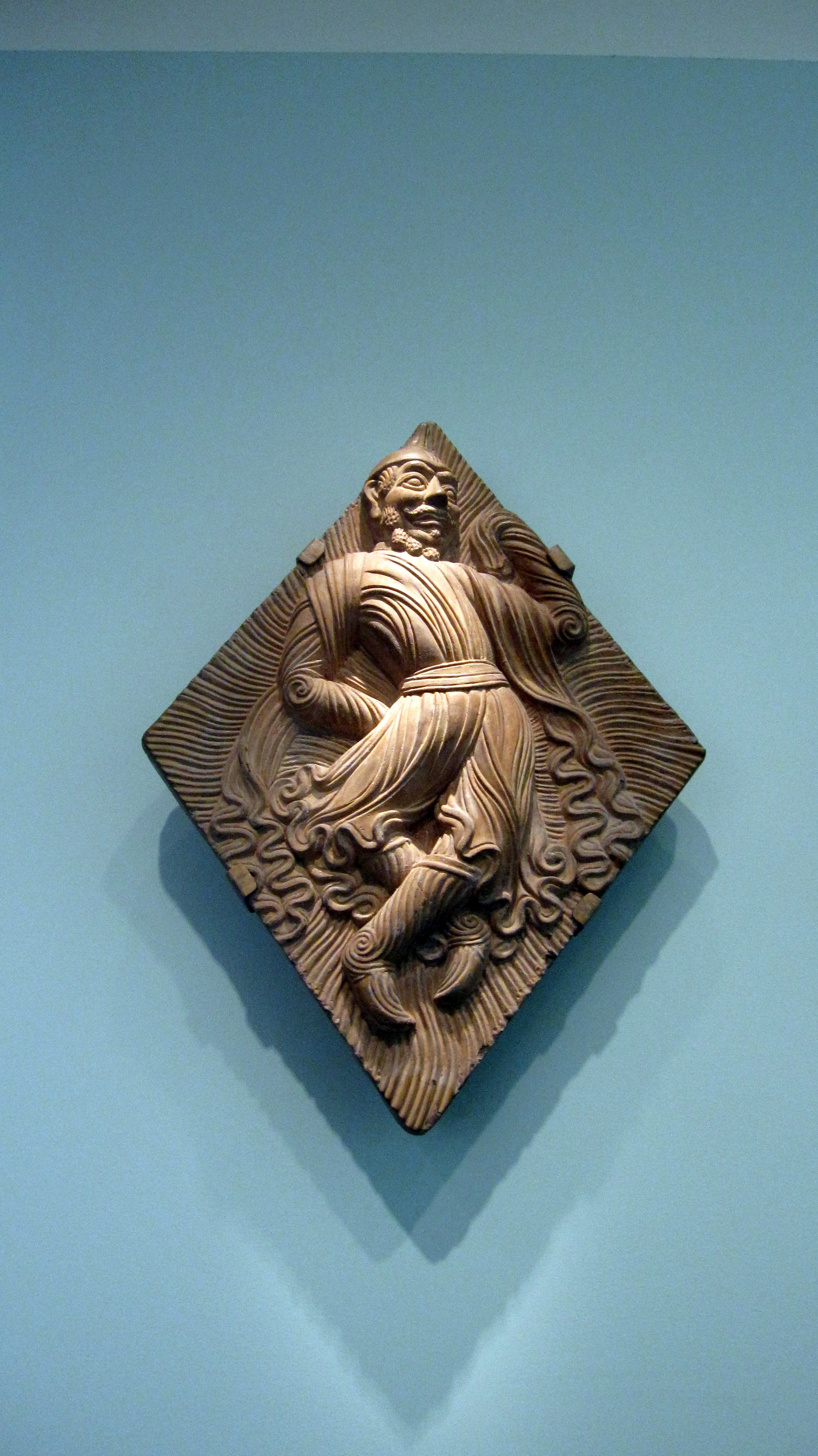
Dancer, Pagoda of Syudin temple

== See also ==
- Sogdian Whirl dance
- Dance in China
- Dunhuang dance
- Iranians in China
- Tomb of Yu Hong
