= Sogdian Whirl dance =

Form of dance

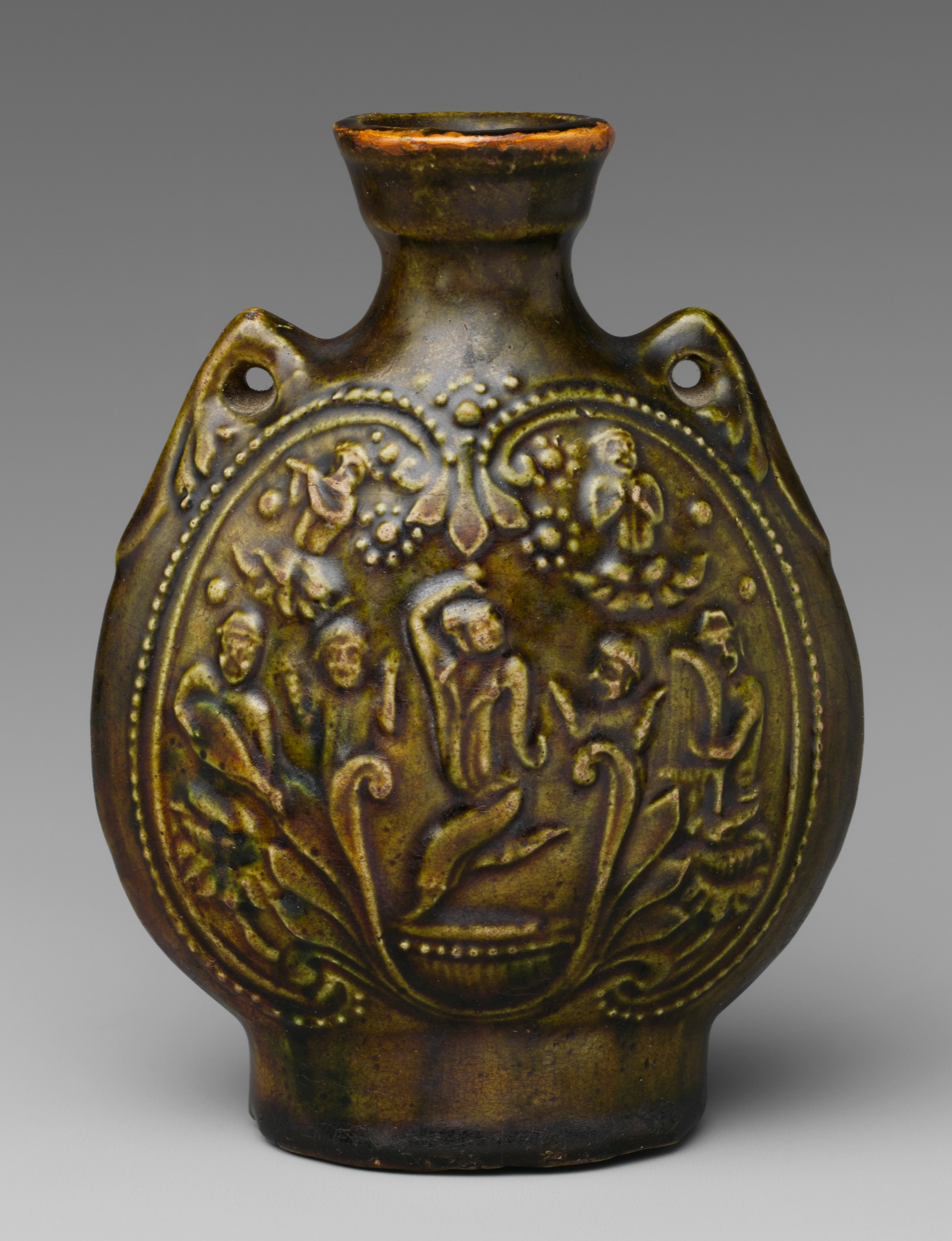
6th-century flask showing a performer dancing the Sogdian whirl

The Sogdian Whirl dance or Sogdian Whirl (胡旋, Húxuăn, "Whirling Barbarian", also 胡旋舞, Húxuănwǔ, "Dance of the Whirling Barbarian", sometimes rendered as "Whirling barbarian" but known as "Sogdian Whirl dance" or simply "Sogdian whirl" to Western scholars) was a Sogdian dance imported into China in the first half of the first millennium AD. The dance was imitated by the Chinese and became popular in China, where it went on to be performed at court.

== History ==
The Sogdian Whirl and other similar, imported dances were popular in China during the Tang dynasty, especially in Chang'an and Luoyang.

The Sogdian merchant-dancers, who performed different dances but were especially renowned for this dance, were very famed in China. In the Sogdian Whirl, a young woman was spinning inside a circle. The Sogdian Whirl became popular in China. It was performed both in the Chinese court and in China itself. Sources from the Tang dynasty such as the Old Book of Tang attest to it being performed at court. The dance was performed at court by, among others, the Emperor Xuanzong of Tang and Yang Guifei.

The Sogdian Whirl was depicted in the funerary art of Sogdians in China. Further, it was depicted on many native Chinese tombs, which further shows its popularity in China.

== Gallery ==
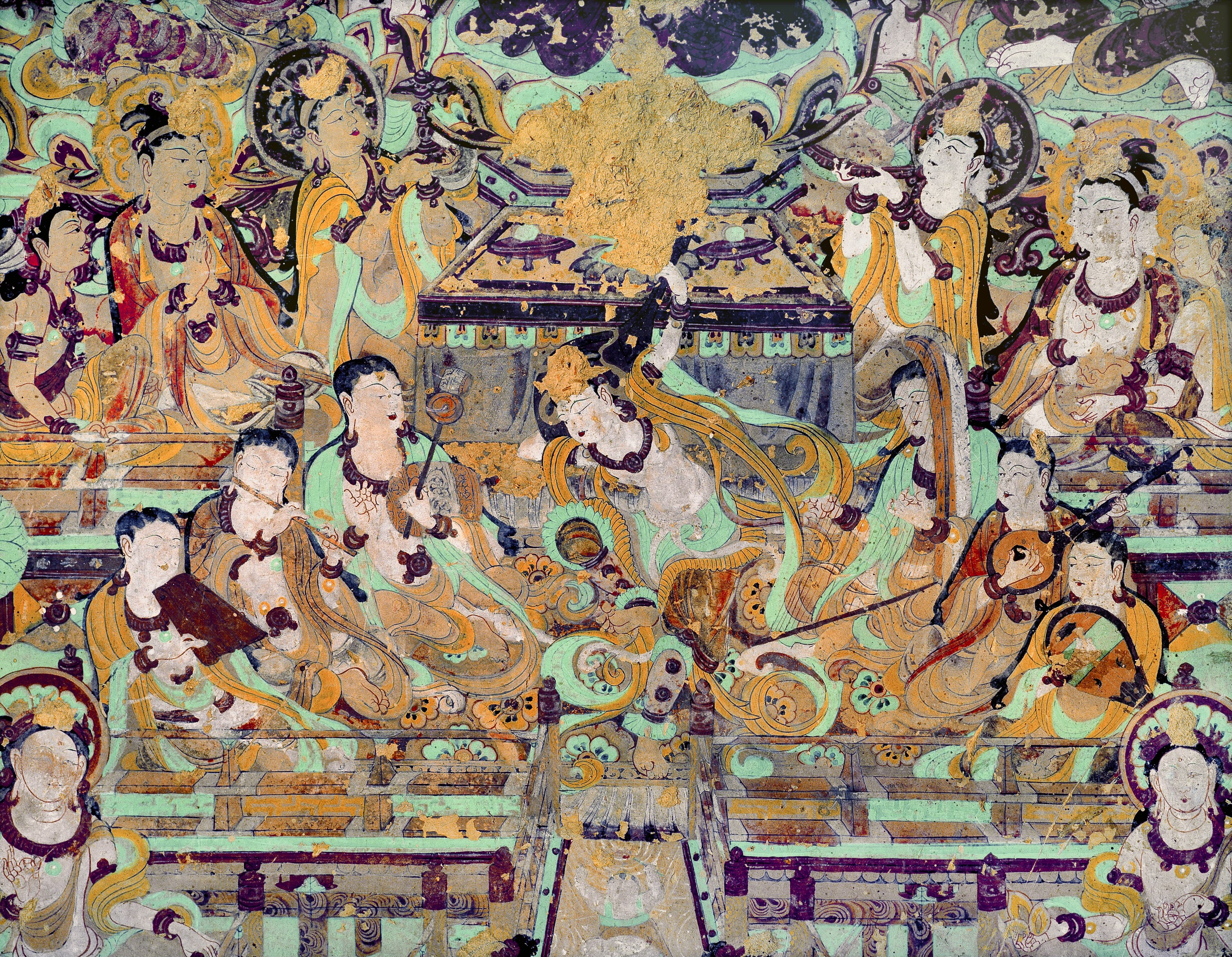
Buddhist cave art, a dancer spins while the orchestra plays. Grotto 46 Left interior wall, second panel. Also called cave 112.

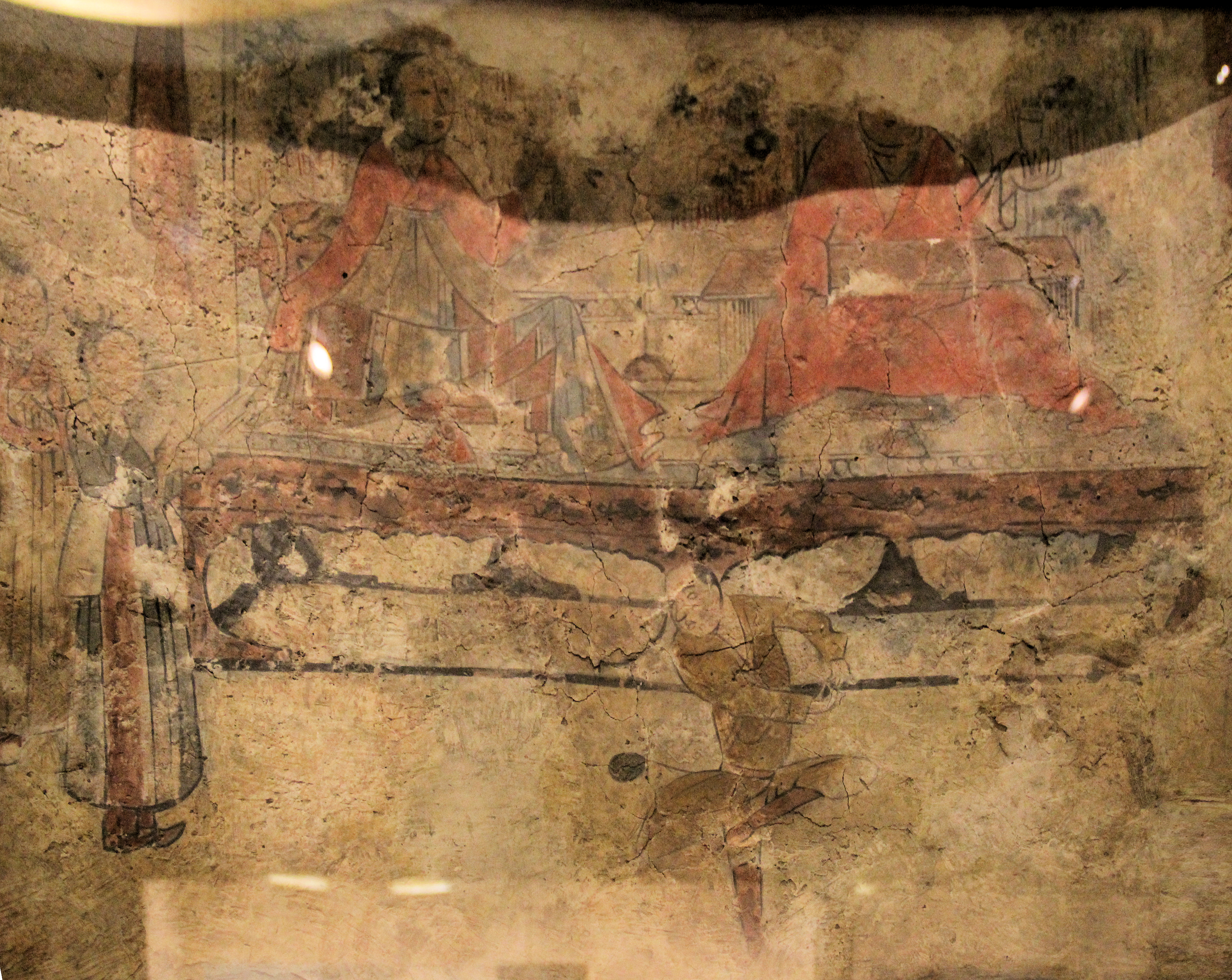
Sui dynasty tomb wall painting, with "swirling dance"

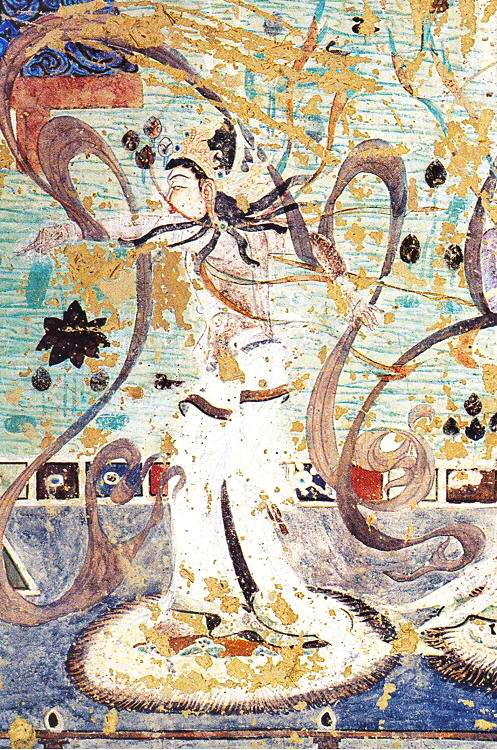
Cave 220 “Hu xuan” dancer in mural from Mogao.

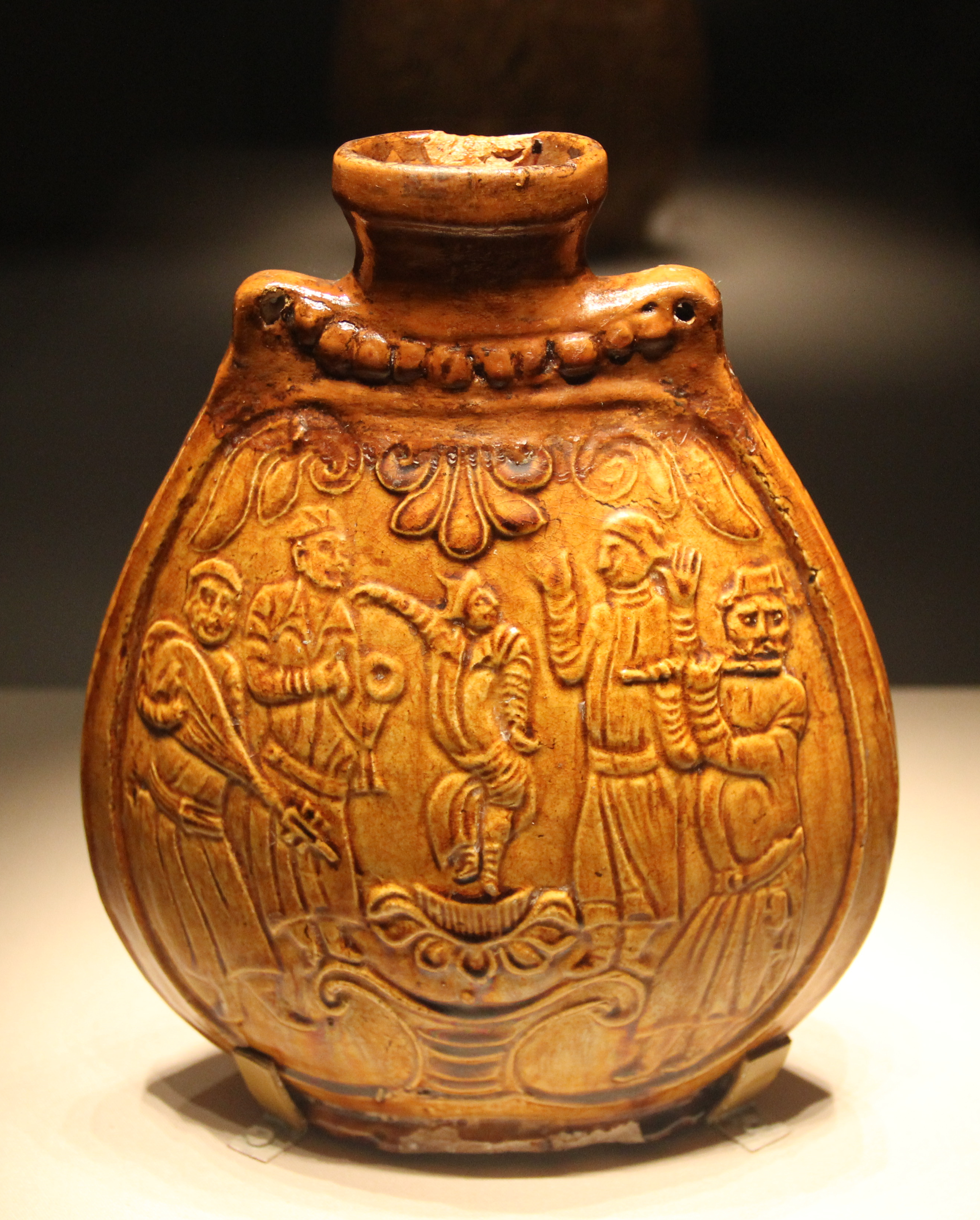
Northern Qi jar with Central Asian (probably Sogdian) dancers and musicians from the tomb at Anyang, 575 CE.

== See also ==
- Sogdian art
- Iranians in China
- Tang China
- Huteng dance
