= Anikova dish =

Cast silver dish

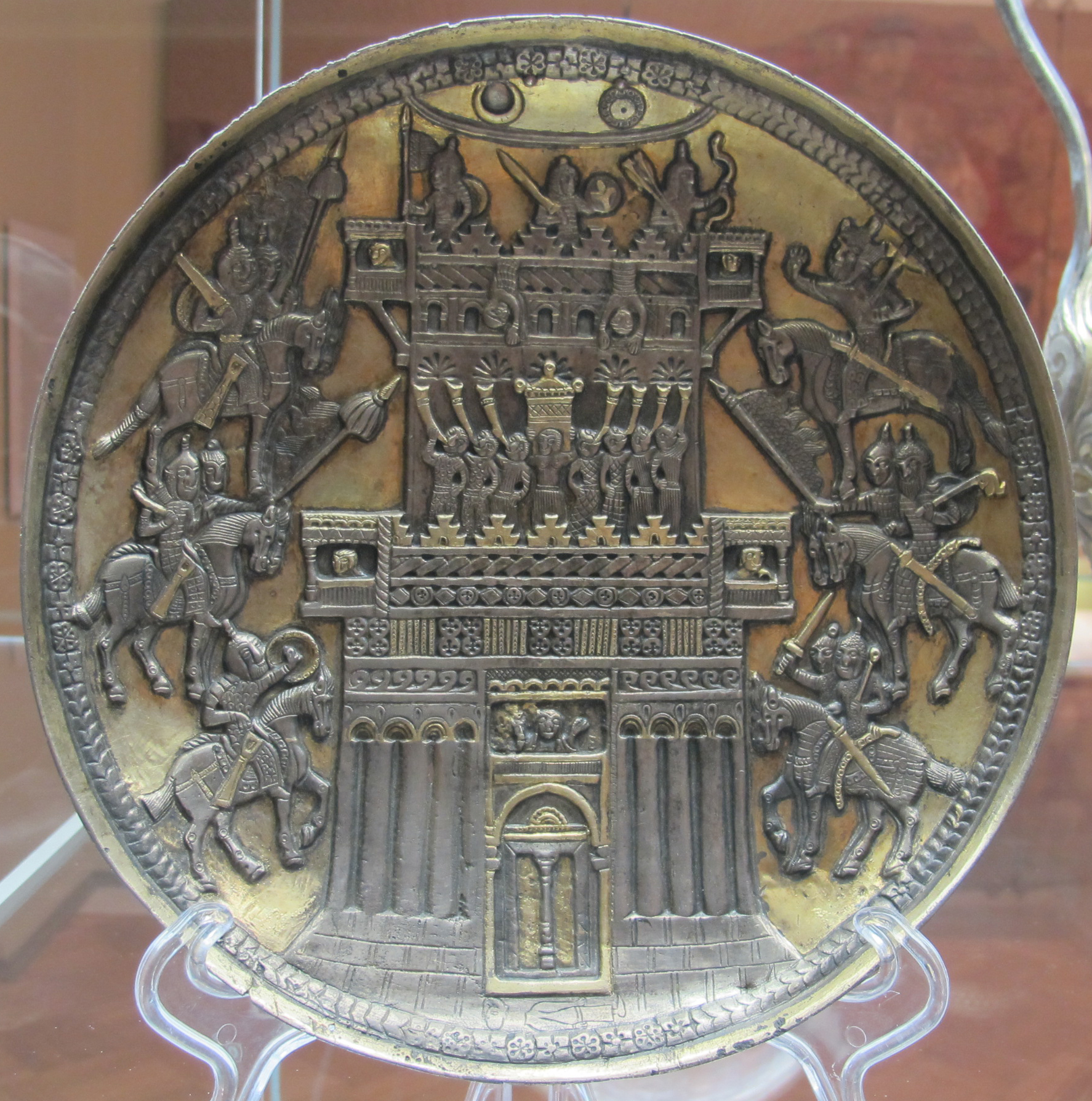
- Nestorian Christian plate with decoration of a besieged Jericho, by Sogdian artists under Karluk dominion, in Semirechye. Cast silver of the 9th-10th century, copied from an original 8th century plate.
- Material: Silver with gilding
- Size: 23.9 cm (diameter)
- Created: Original: 8th century CE; Casts: 9th–10th century CE
- Discovered: Bolshe-Anikovskaya, Cherdyn district, Perm province
- Present location: Hermitage Museum, Saint Petersburg, Russia
- Registration: S-46

The Anikova dish or Anikovsky dish is a cast silver dish representing armoured cavalrymen attacking a fortress in the Siege of Jericho, and thought to have been created in Semirechye (Zhetysu) in Central Asia in the 9th–10th century. It was found in 1909 near the village of Bolshe-Anikovskaya, Cherdyn district, Perm province. It is now in the State Hermitage Museum, St. Petersburg (S-46).

== Nestorian biblical scene ==
The scene on this plate has been identified as a series of episodes from the Book of Joshua related to the Siege of Jericho. Reading from the bottom up, the harlot Rahab peers out the window above a door through which she lets Joshua's spies into the Canaanite city of Jericho. Above, in the center of the plate, priests blow trumpets as the Israelites’ Ark of the Covenant is held aloft (Joshua 2 and 6), and farther up, another Canaanite city has been taken. At the top are the sun and the moon, which at the orders of Joshua (the warrior on horseback in the upper right of the plate) have come to a standstill in the heavens (Joshua 10:12–13).

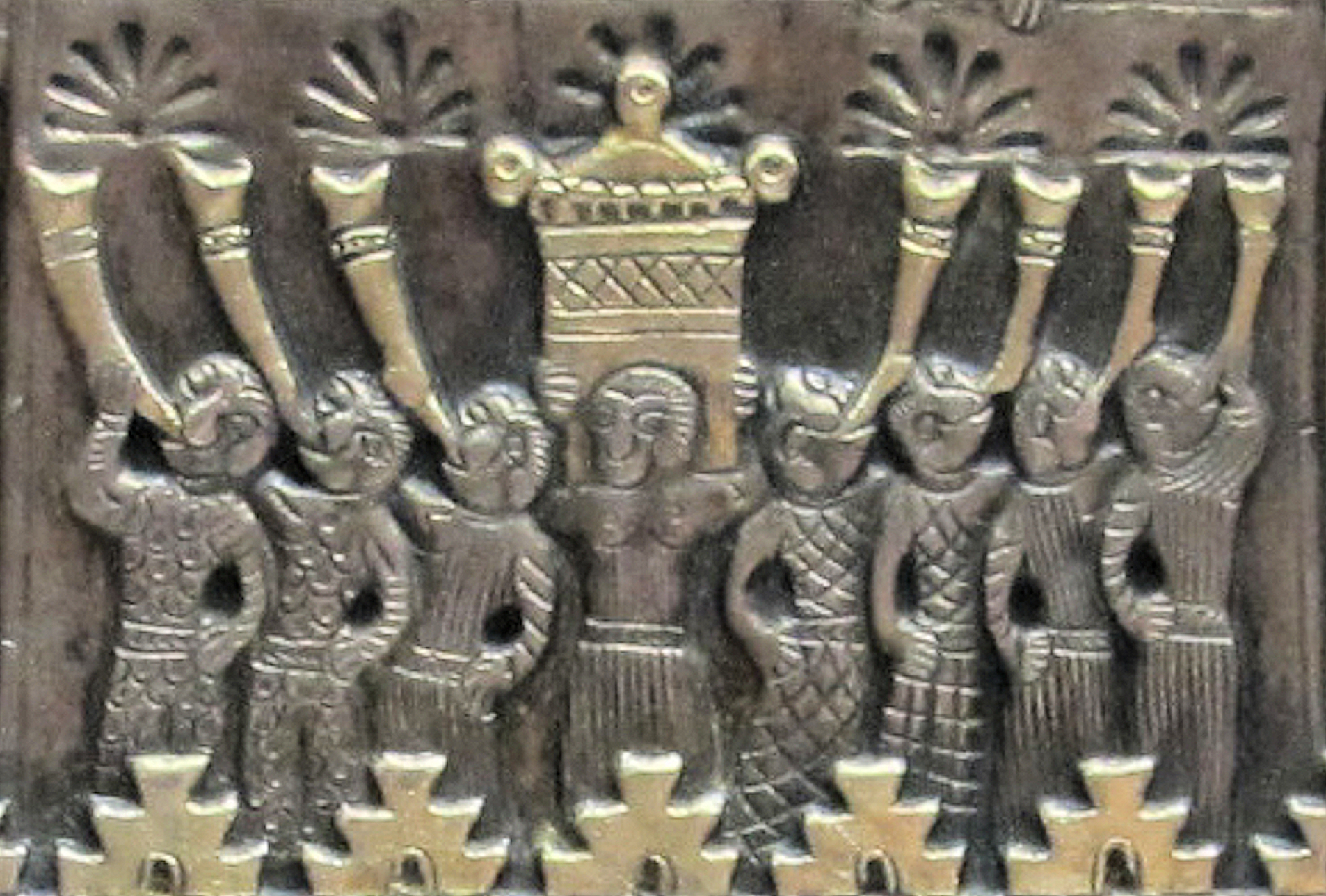
The Ark of the Covenant on the Anikova dish

The plate is generally described as having been created by the Nestorian Christian Sogdian colonies of Semirechye, which had fled the Muslim occupation of Sogdia in 722, and were now under the dominion of the Karluks. An identical dish, but crisper in details, the "Nildin dish", was found in Verkhne-Nildino, and is now in the collection of the museum of the Institute of Archeology and Ethnography of the Siberian branch of the Russian Academy of Sciences in Novosibirsk. It dates to the 8th – early 9th centuries. The Anikova dish was probably cast, by using clay or gipsum cast as a mold, from the "Nildin dish", which is therefore the 8th century original model, whose designs are therefore attributable to this period (c. 800 CE).

Another contemporary dish, from the same location and probably the same workshop, shows Syriac Christian scenes and Syriac inscriptions. Several similar plates were also discovered. Syriac was the language of the Church of the East ("Nestorians"), which converted the Karluk Turks circa 775-800 CE. A Church of the East Metropolitan was established at Kashgar and at Navekat, near the Karlul capital of Suyab. Several churches dating to the 9th–10th century were also discovered in the region. The Karluks would consolidate into the powerful Kara-Khanid Khanate from 840.

== Armour and weapons ==
The equipment of the soldiers in the plaque provides valuable insight regarding Central Asian armies during the 8th century CE. The armour of the warriors is lamellar, often made of small plates on fabric. Also visible are mail, brigandine, quilted and laminated armour and coats of mail. This type of armour is thought to have derived from the designs of the "technologically advanced peoples of the Far East", with lamellar cuirasses, long lamellar coats and helmets made of narrow segments attached to a frame, and is thought to have influenced the weapon developments of the Western Asian Muslim world. The armour dates to the 8th century, which much be the date of the original dish.

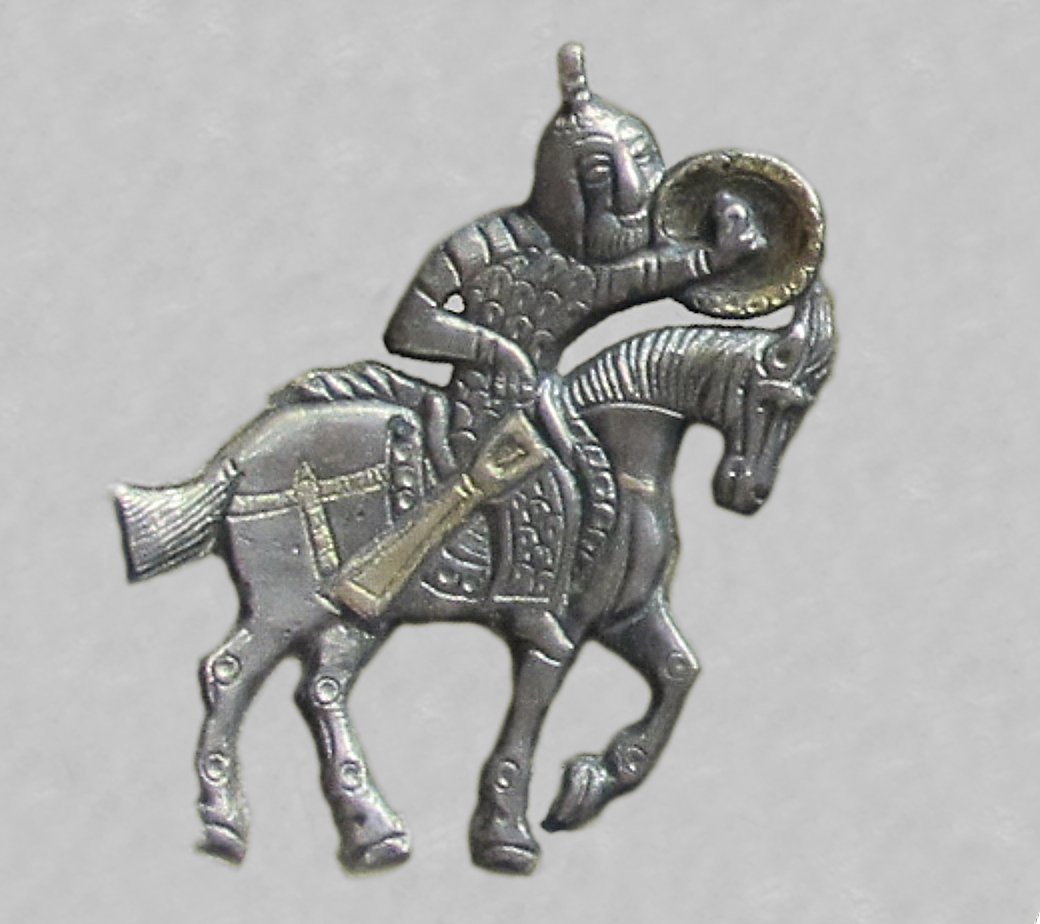
Anikova dish horseman, with an hourglass quiver on the side and holding a round shield. c. 800 CE design.

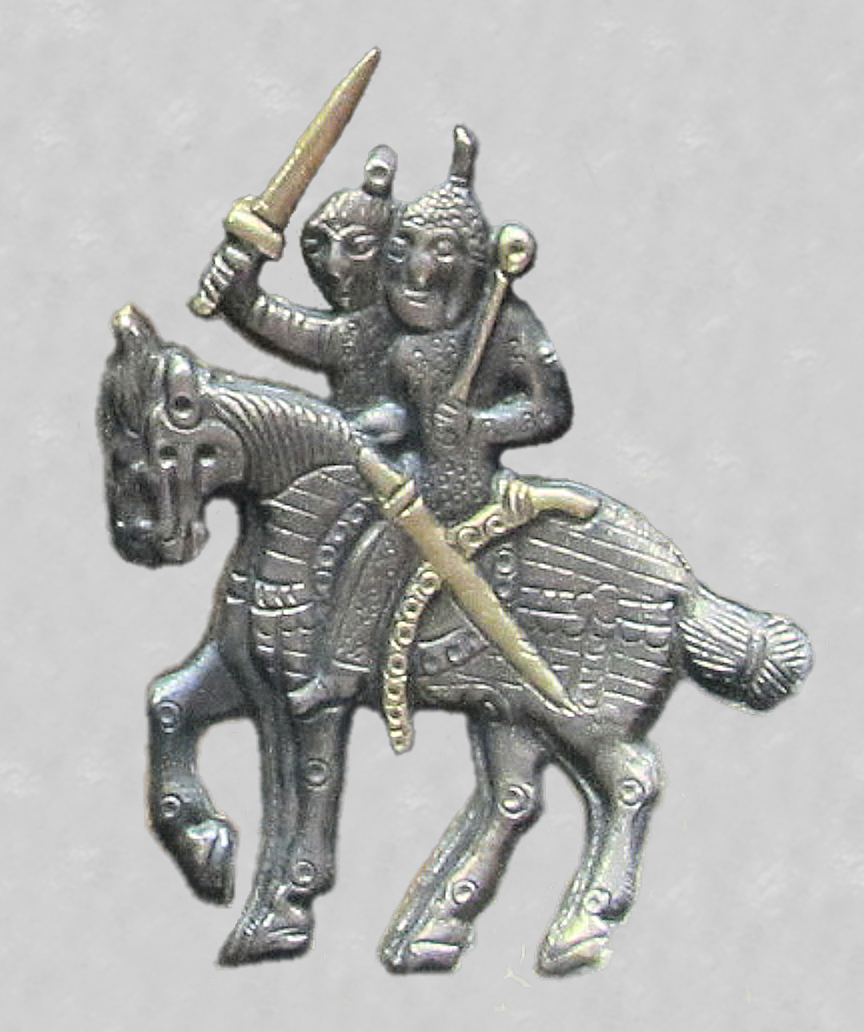
Anikova, two horsemen. One holds a sword, the other holds a mace and at this side has a sword and a C-shaped tubular case designed for an unstrung bow. c. 800 CE design.

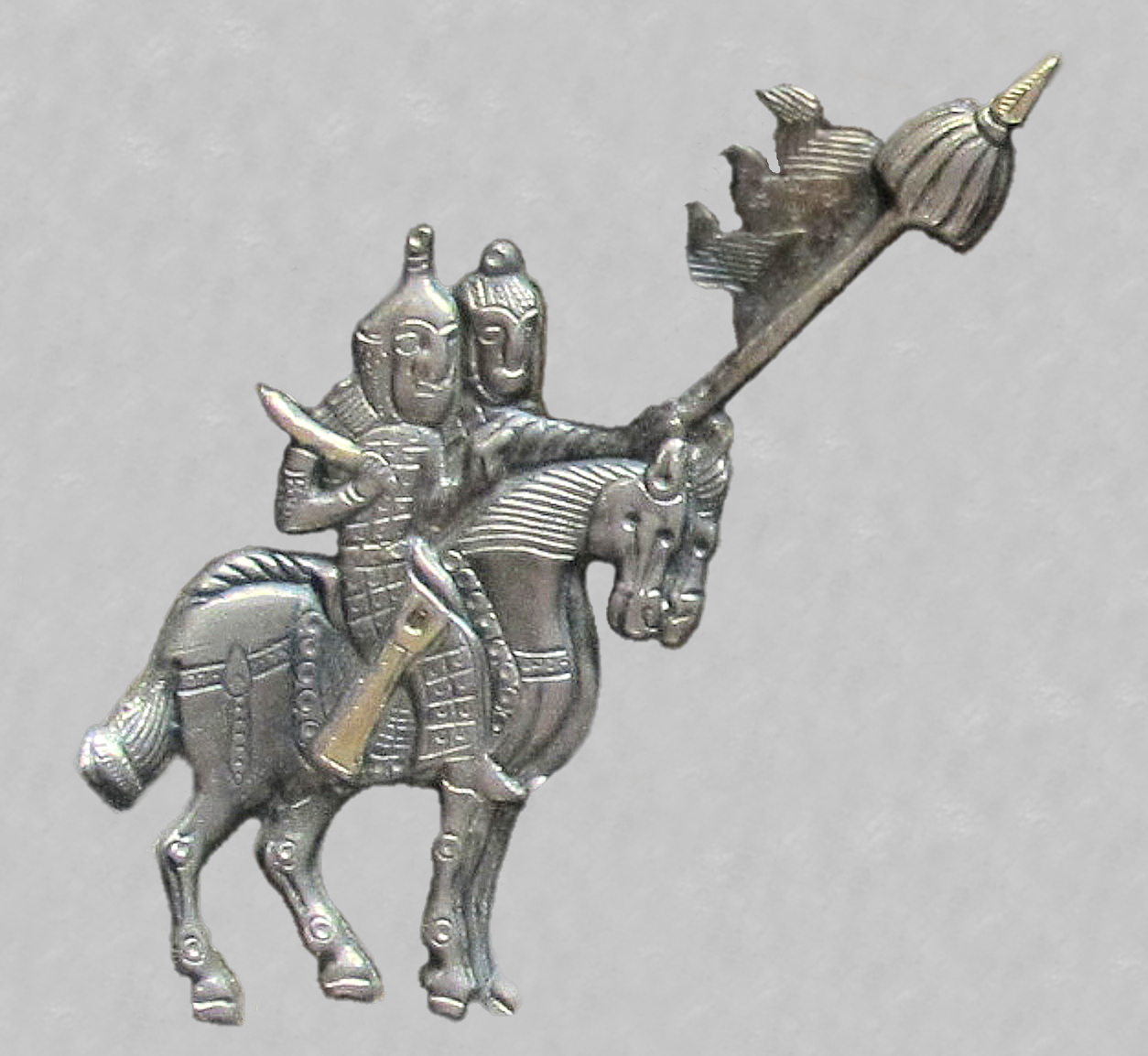
Anikova, two horsemen. One has an hourglass quiver on the side, the other holds a banner with 3 pennants, topped by a horsehair tassel (a sort of tugh). c. 800 CE design.

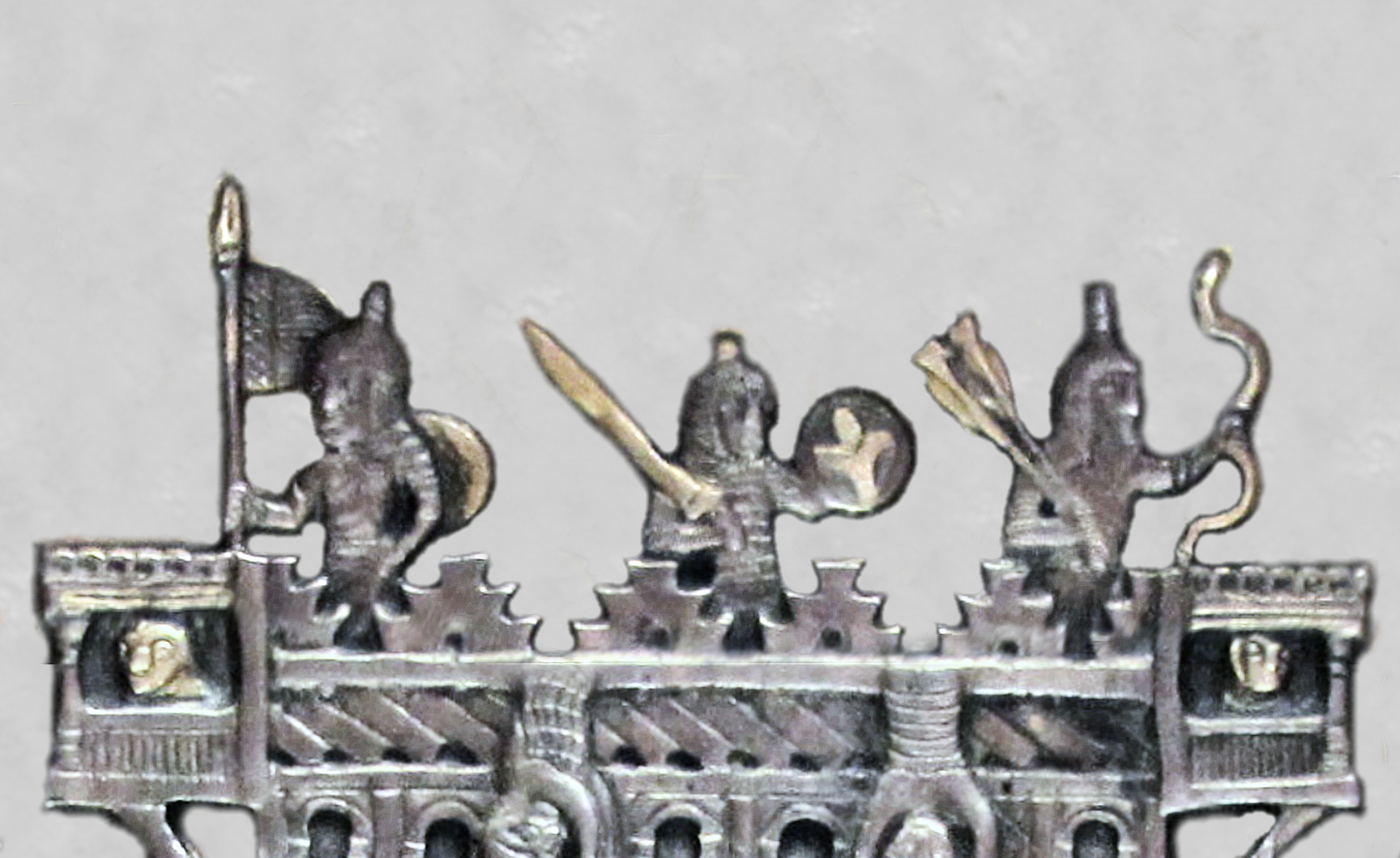
Anikova, soldiers on the city walls. The soldier on the right has a composite bow with recurved tips, and arrows with bulbous nocks.

== Fortress ==
The castle shown in the plate is thought to be characteristic of 8th century Sogdian designs. It is quite similar to the Great Kyz Kala in Merv.

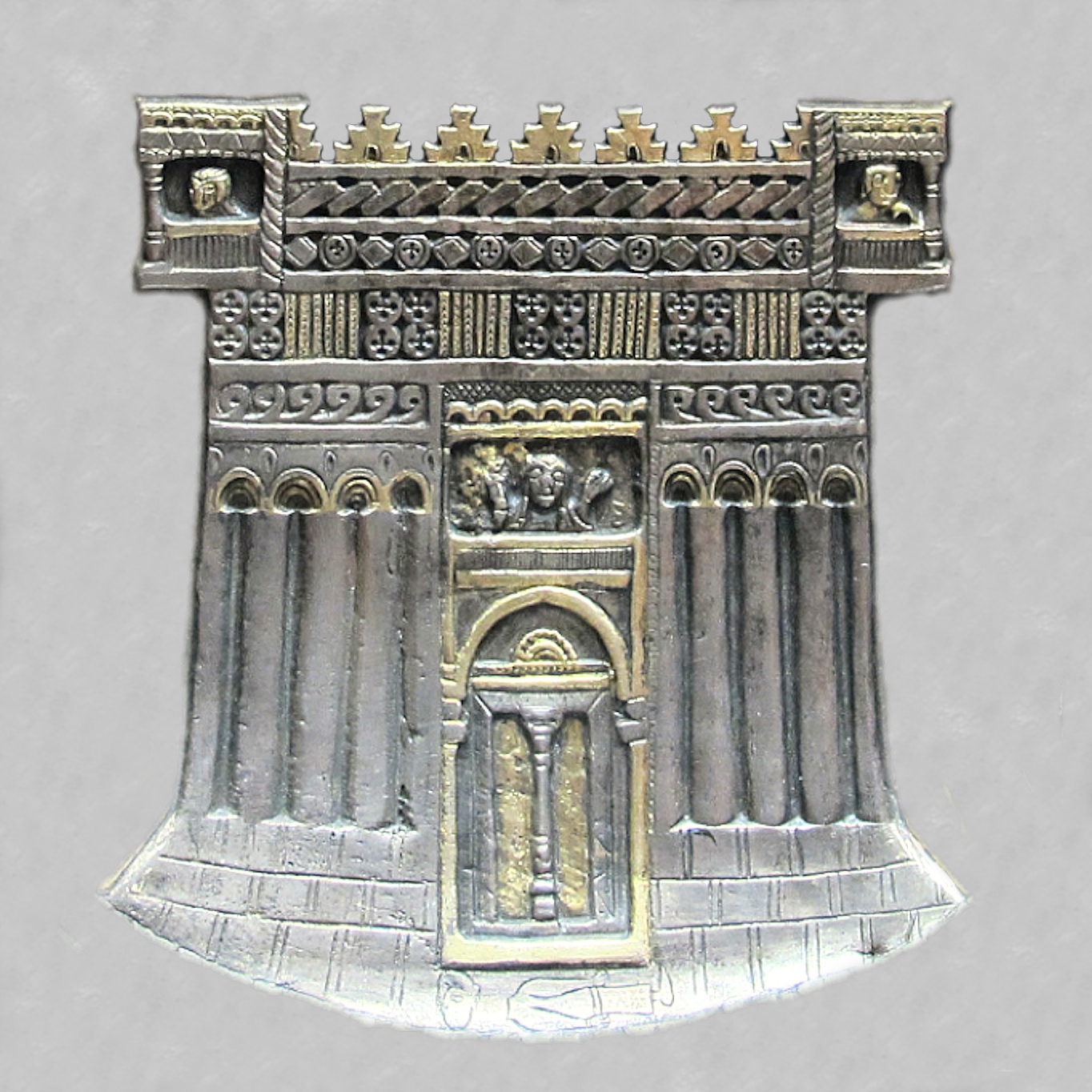
Sogdian fortress in the Anikova dish, c. 800 CE design.

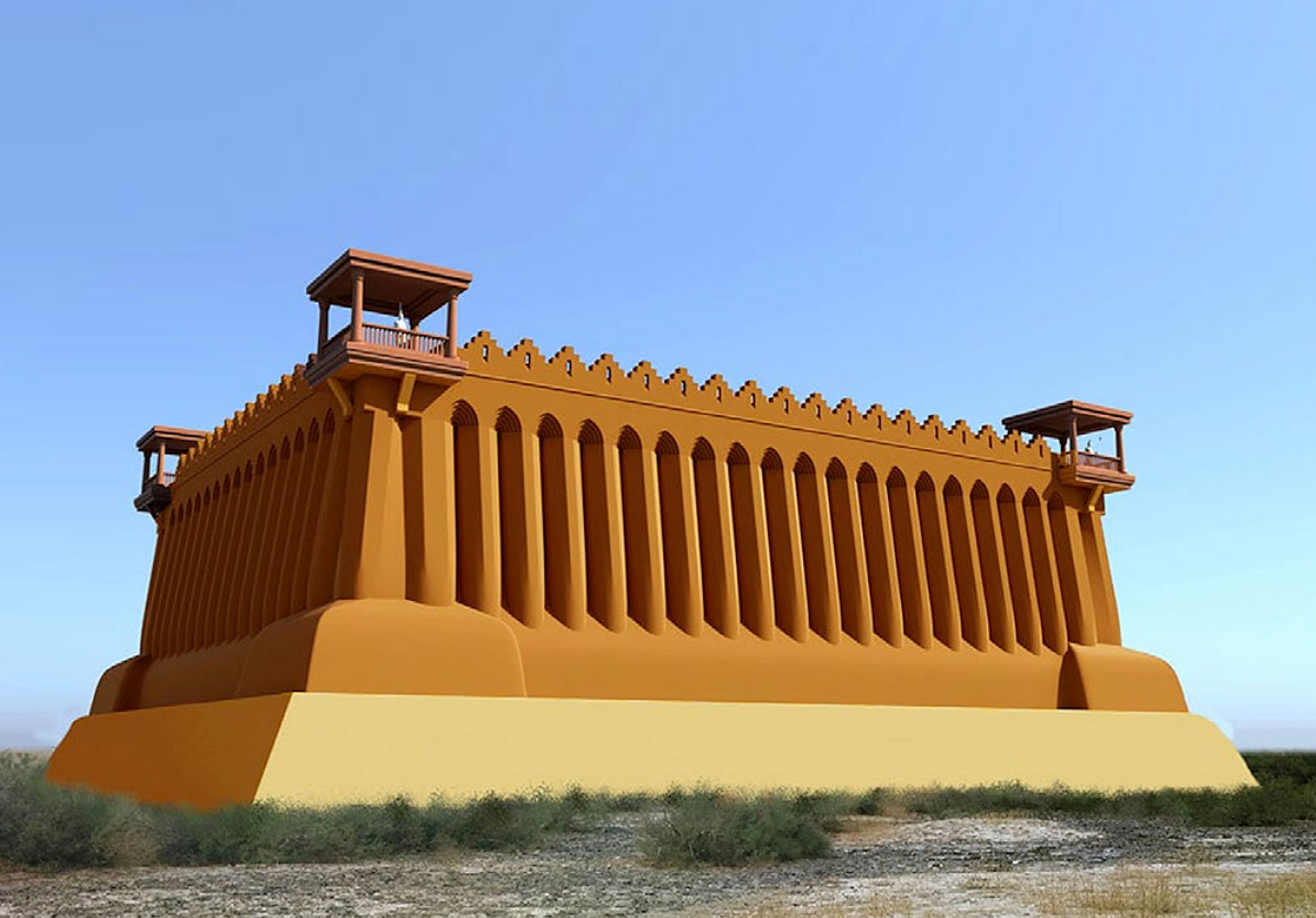
Reconstruction of a similar fortress: the Great Kyz Kala in Merv.

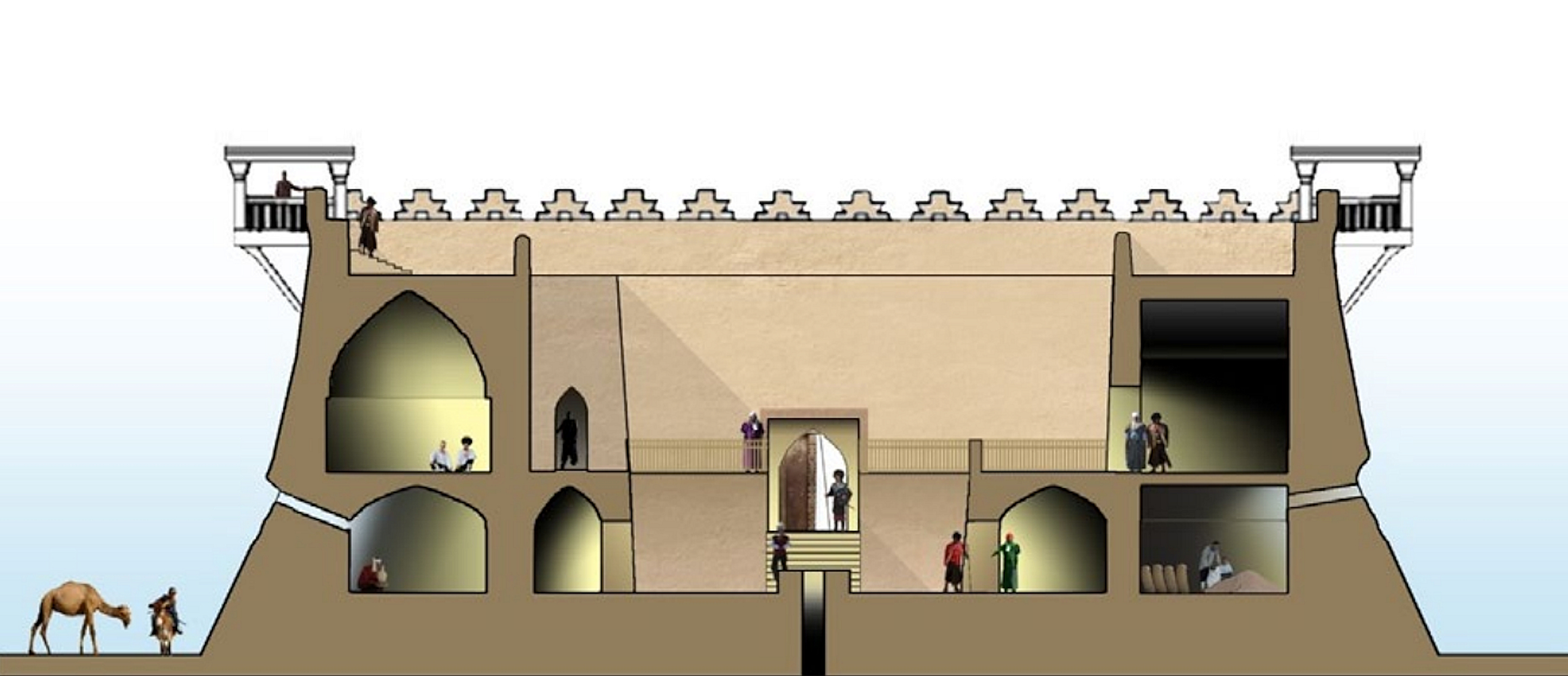
Cross-section of the Great Kyz Kala.

== Parallels ==
Parallels can be seen with the images of armoured knights of the Kyzyl Caves or Shorchuk in Xinjiang (scenes of the "Distribution of the Buddha's ashes"), or those of the Penjikent murals, which shares similar elements.

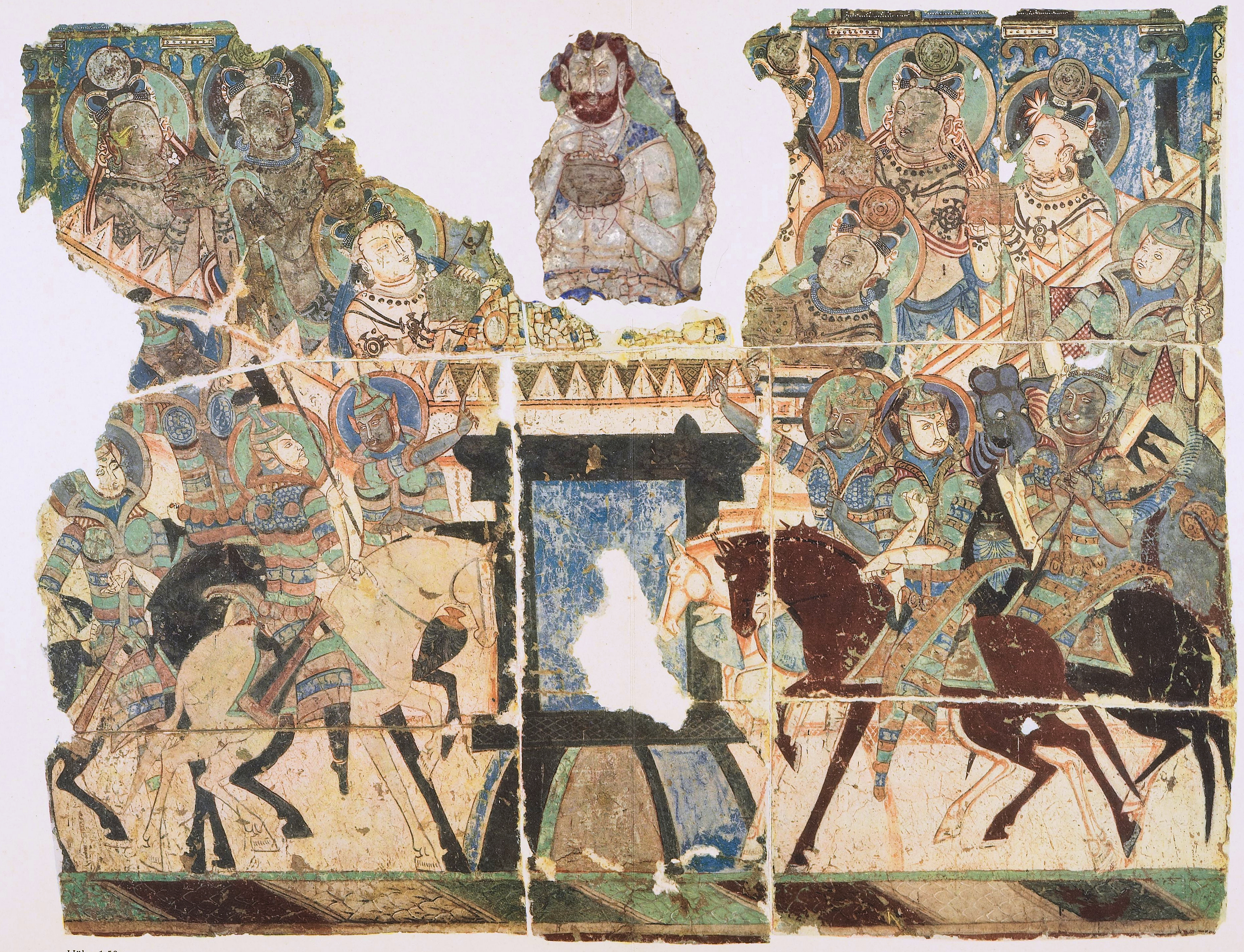
Knights in armour in the War of the Relics, back corridor of Maya Cave (224), Kyzyl Caves. 6th century CE.

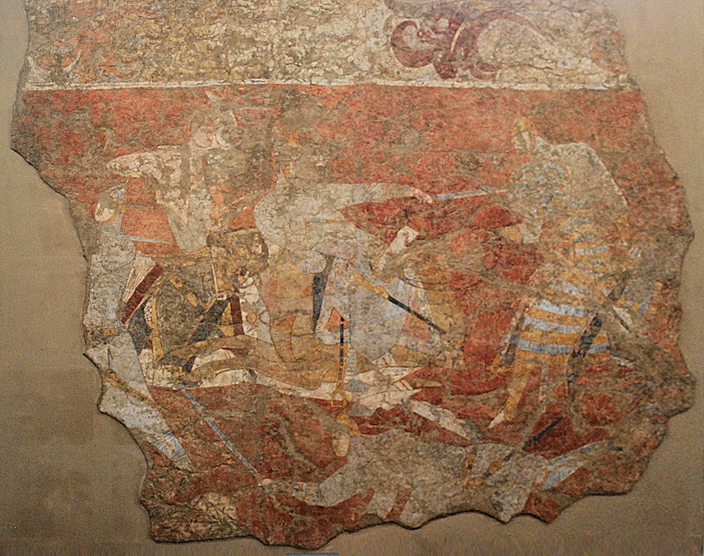
Battle scene with soldier in armour. Penjikent murals, 6th-7th century CE.

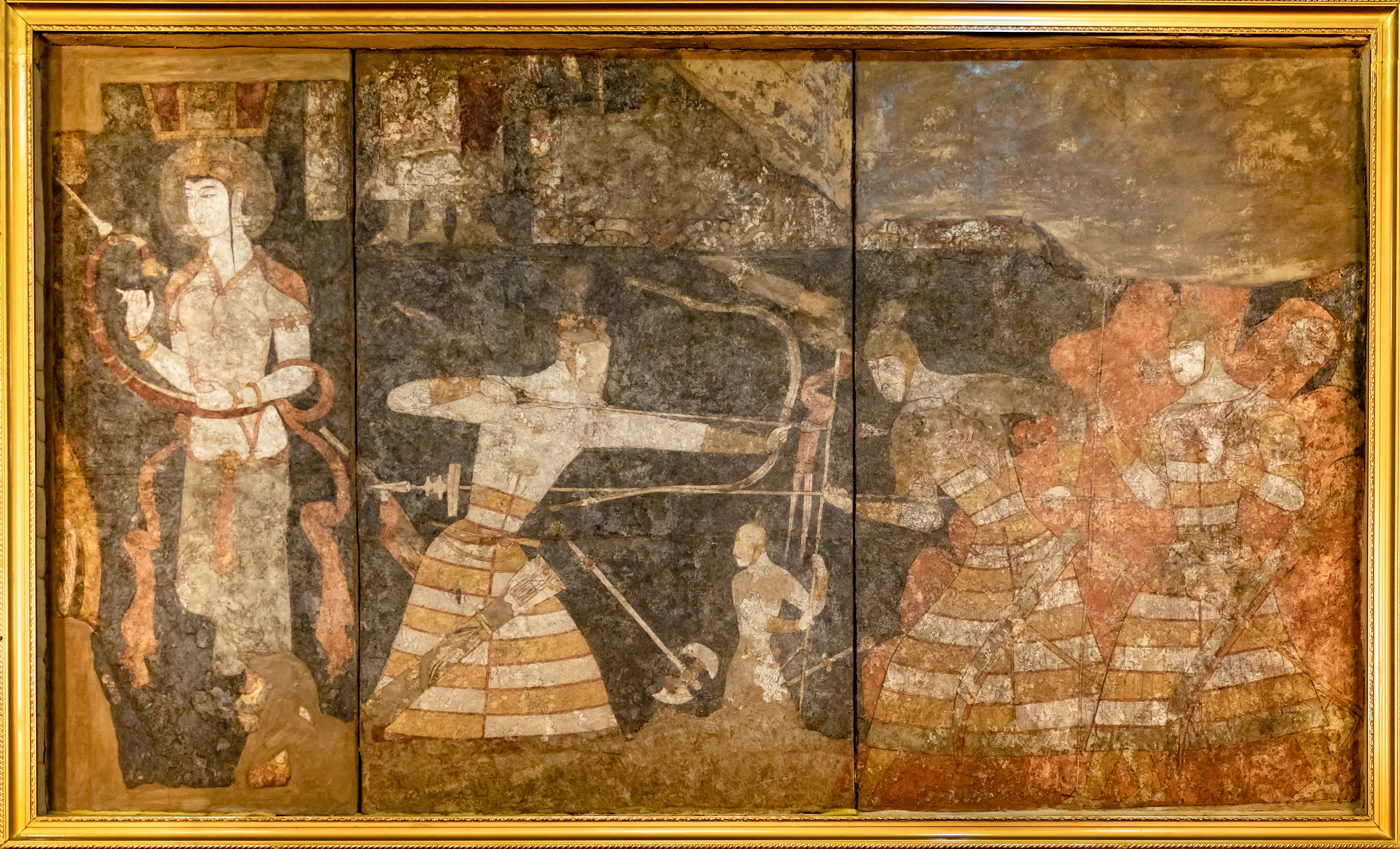
Battle scene with soldiers in armour. Penjikent murals, 6th-7th century CE.

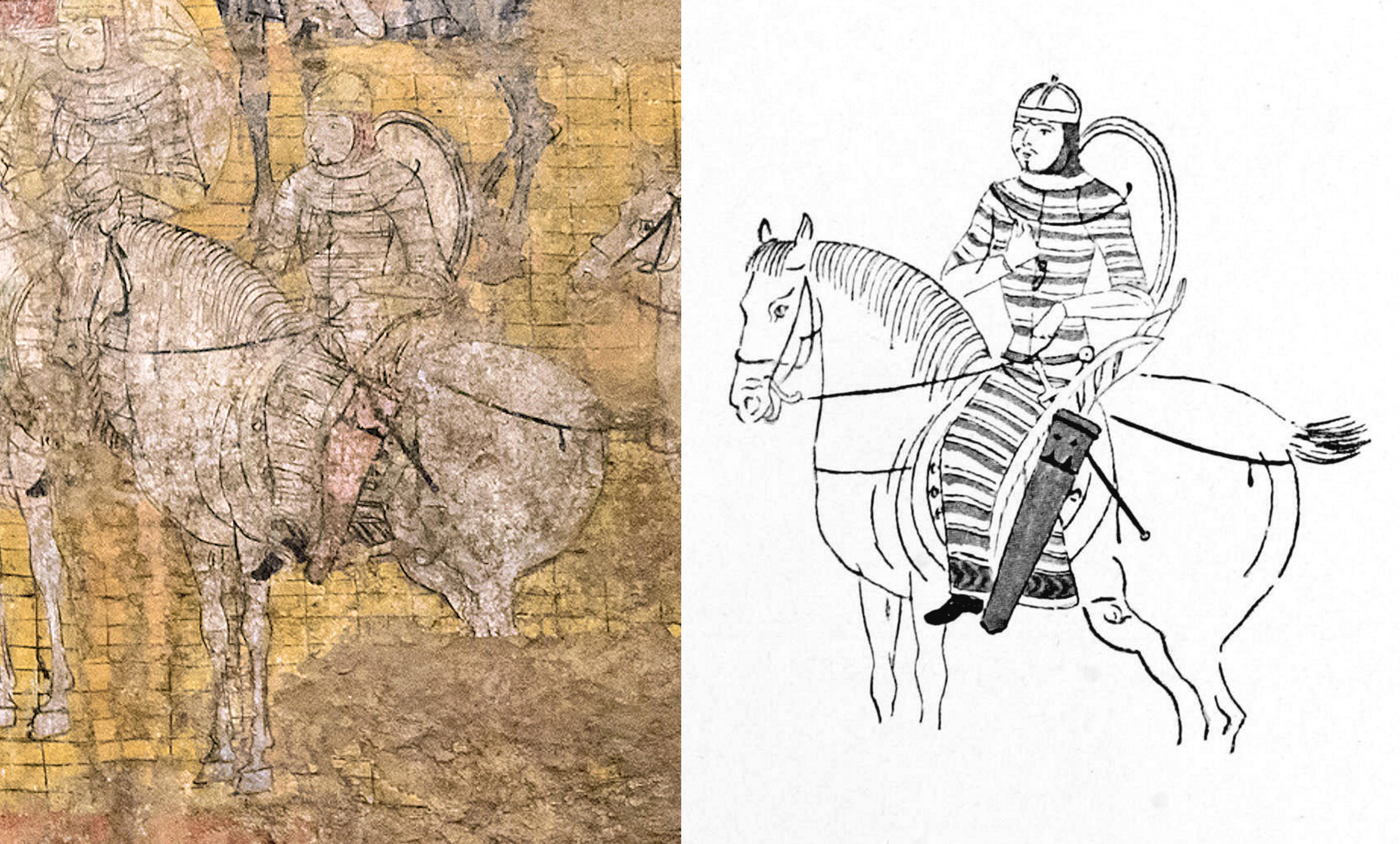
Knight in armour in the Buddhist depiction of the War of the Relics, Shorchuk, Karashahr, 8th century CE.

== Sources ==
- Marshak, Boris (2017). History of Oriental Toreutics of the 3rd–13th Centuries and Problems of Cultural Continuity. St. Petersburg: Academy of Culture’s Research. pp. 333–335. ISBN 978-5-9905898-8-9.
