= Great Kyz Kala =

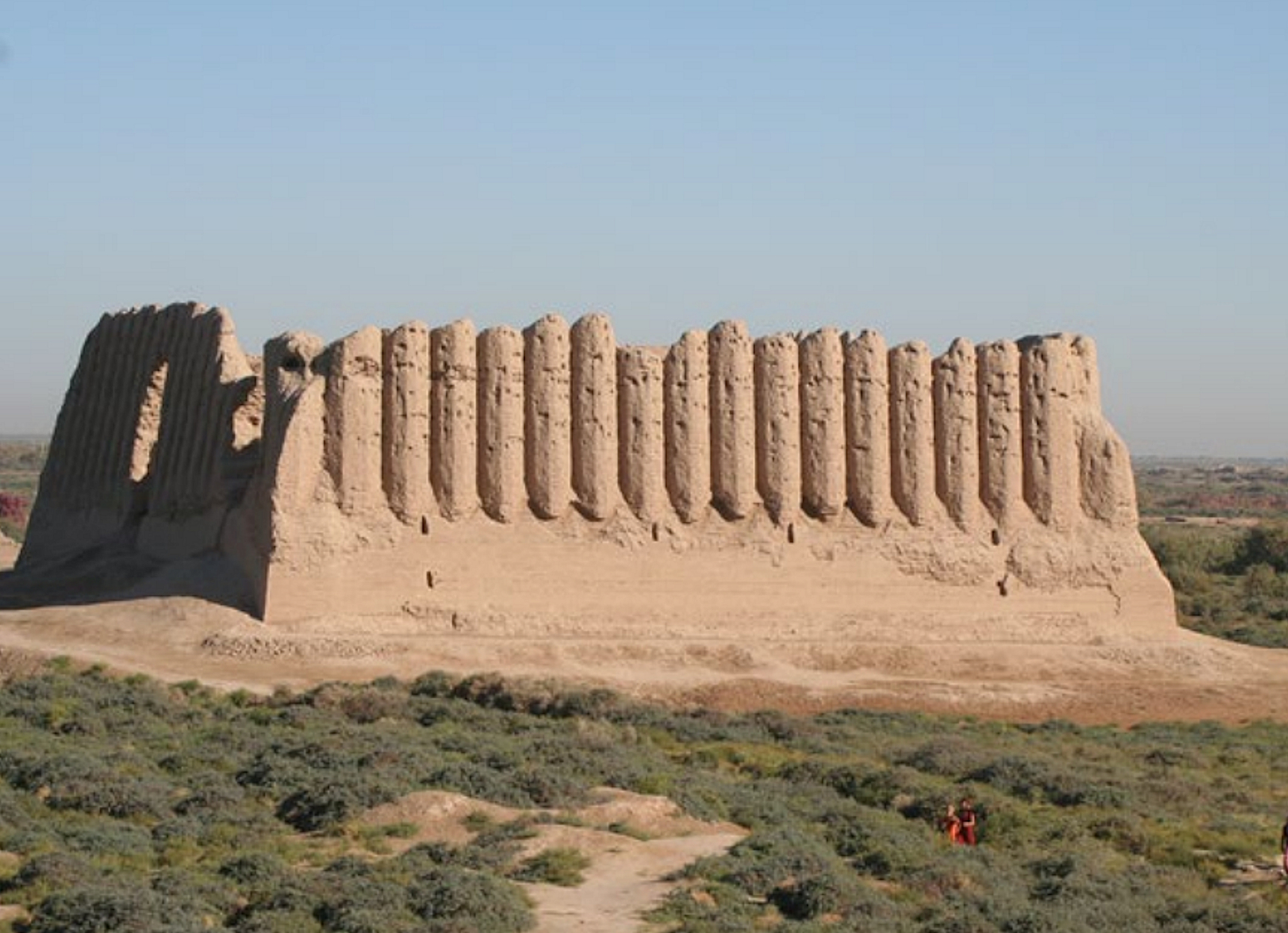
- The Great Kyz Kala.

- Location within Continental Asia Location within Turkmenistan

General information
- Type: Castle
- Architectural style: Sasanian
- Location: Merv, Turkmenistan
- Coordinates: 37°39′18.18″N 62°09′09.21″E

The Great Kyz Kala is a large ruined fortress in the ancient city of Merv, now in Turkmenistan. It is an example of a köshk or kushk type of fortress: an earthen building built on a raised platform, with exterior walls formed of large vertical engaged columns (a series of octagonal half-columns) with large corrugations. These fortresses are equipped with internal palatial rooms, often decorated. It occupied an area of 1,569.84 square metres (16,897.6 sq ft).

The construction date is rather uncertain, with some authors arguing for an early 6th to 7th century date, attributing it to the Sasanian Empire (224–651). It is also attributed to the 8th/9th century CE, corresponding to the Umayyad or Abbasid period.

The Great Kyz Kala was an elite palatial suburban residence, perhaps meant for the use of the governor of Merv. It remained in use until the Seljuks as a function room.

A smaller fortress nearby is the Little Kyz Kala.

== Gallery ==
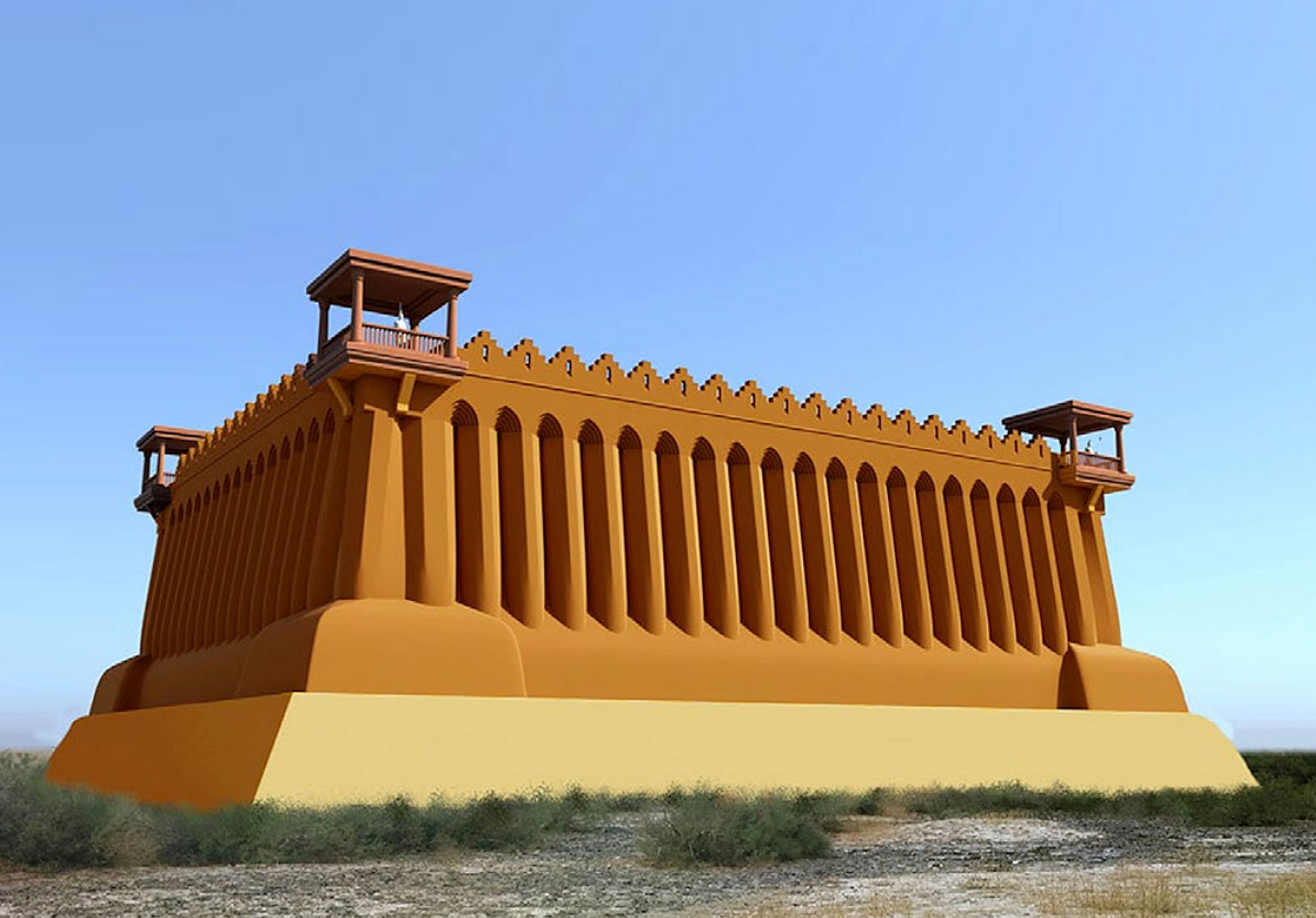
3D reconstruction of the Great Kyz Kala.

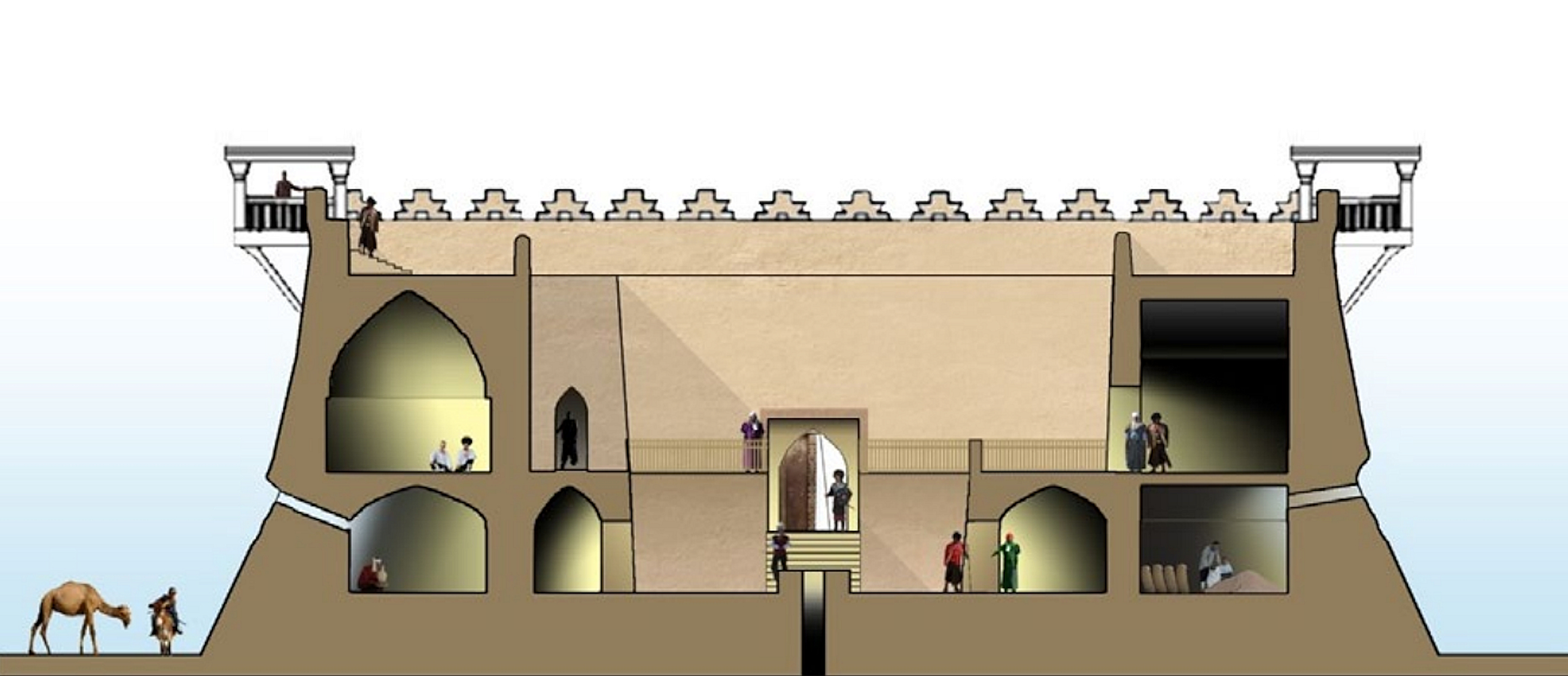
Cross-section of the Great Kyz Kala.

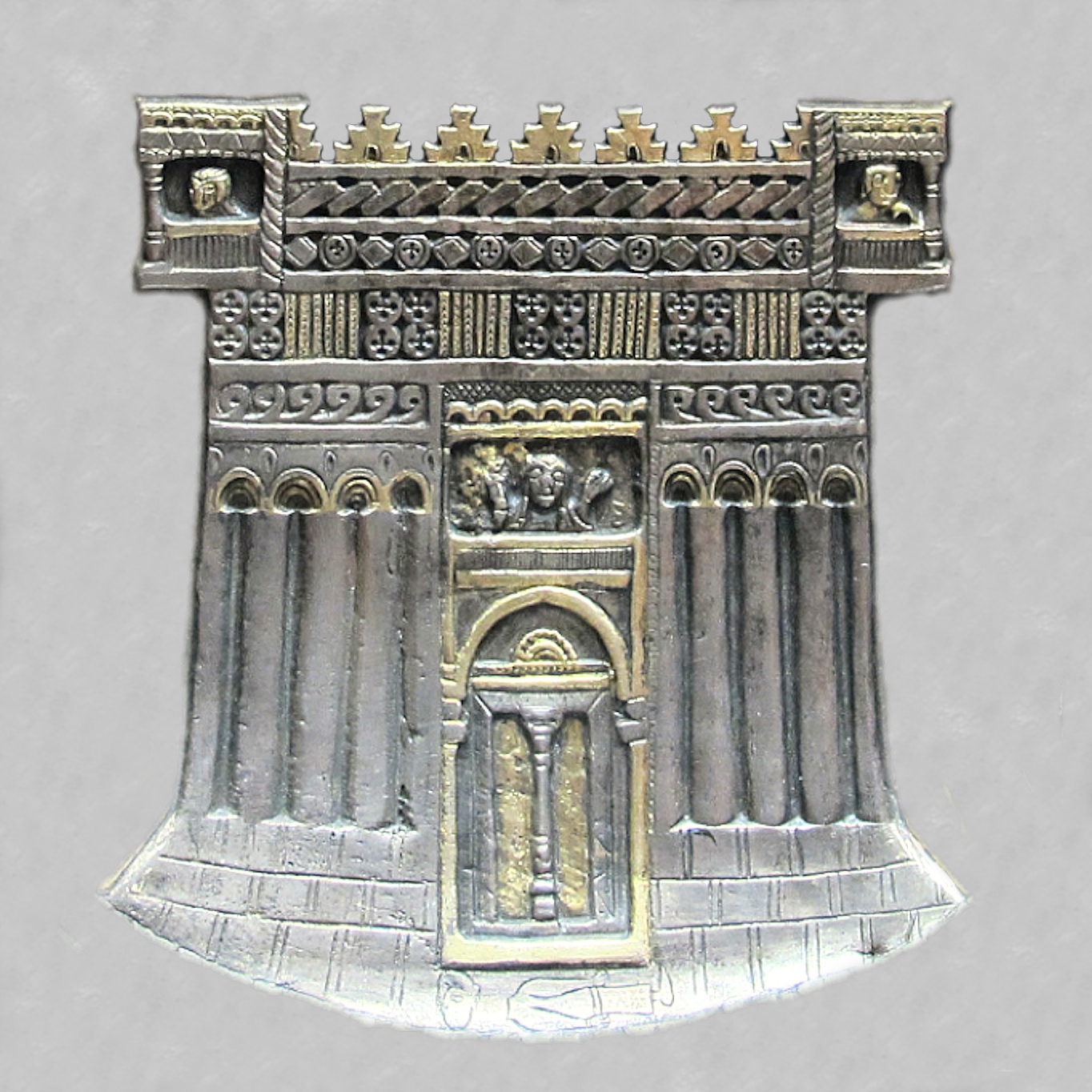
A Sogdian fortress of similar characteristics, on the Anikova dish, c. 800 CE design.

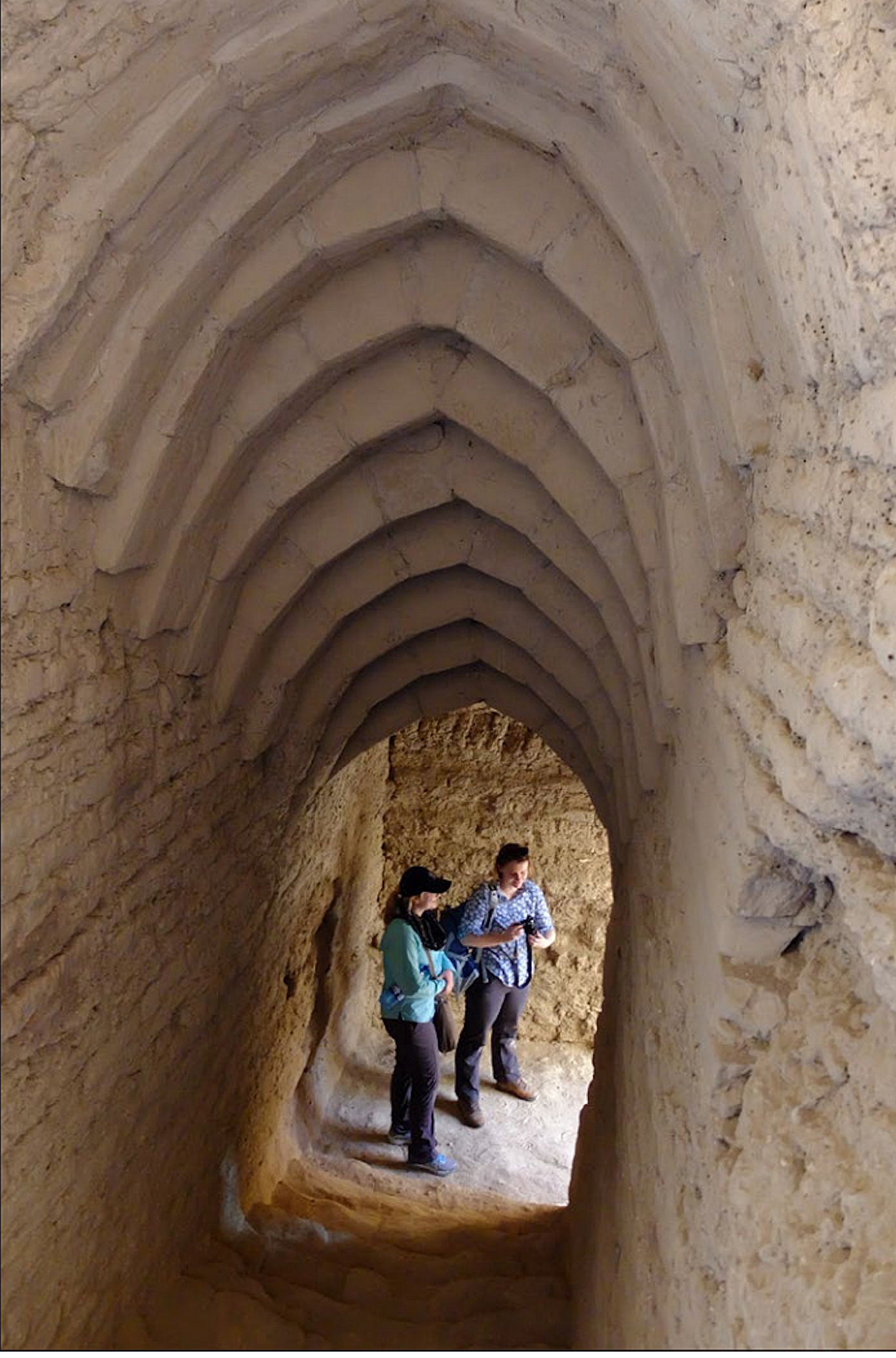
Great Kyz Kala decorative patterns (Internal staircase).

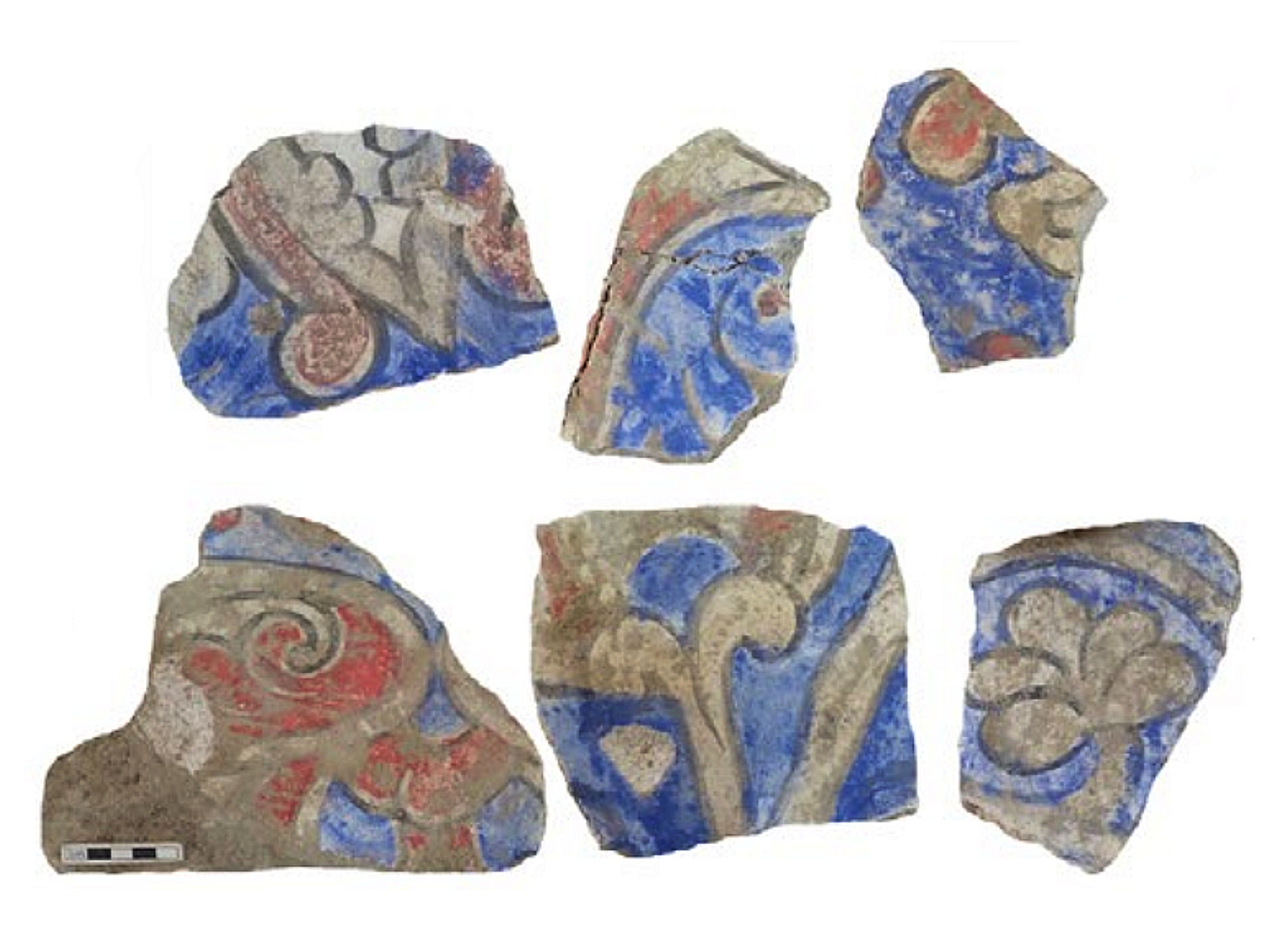
Great Kyz Kala painted plaster, probably from the collapsed upper floor.

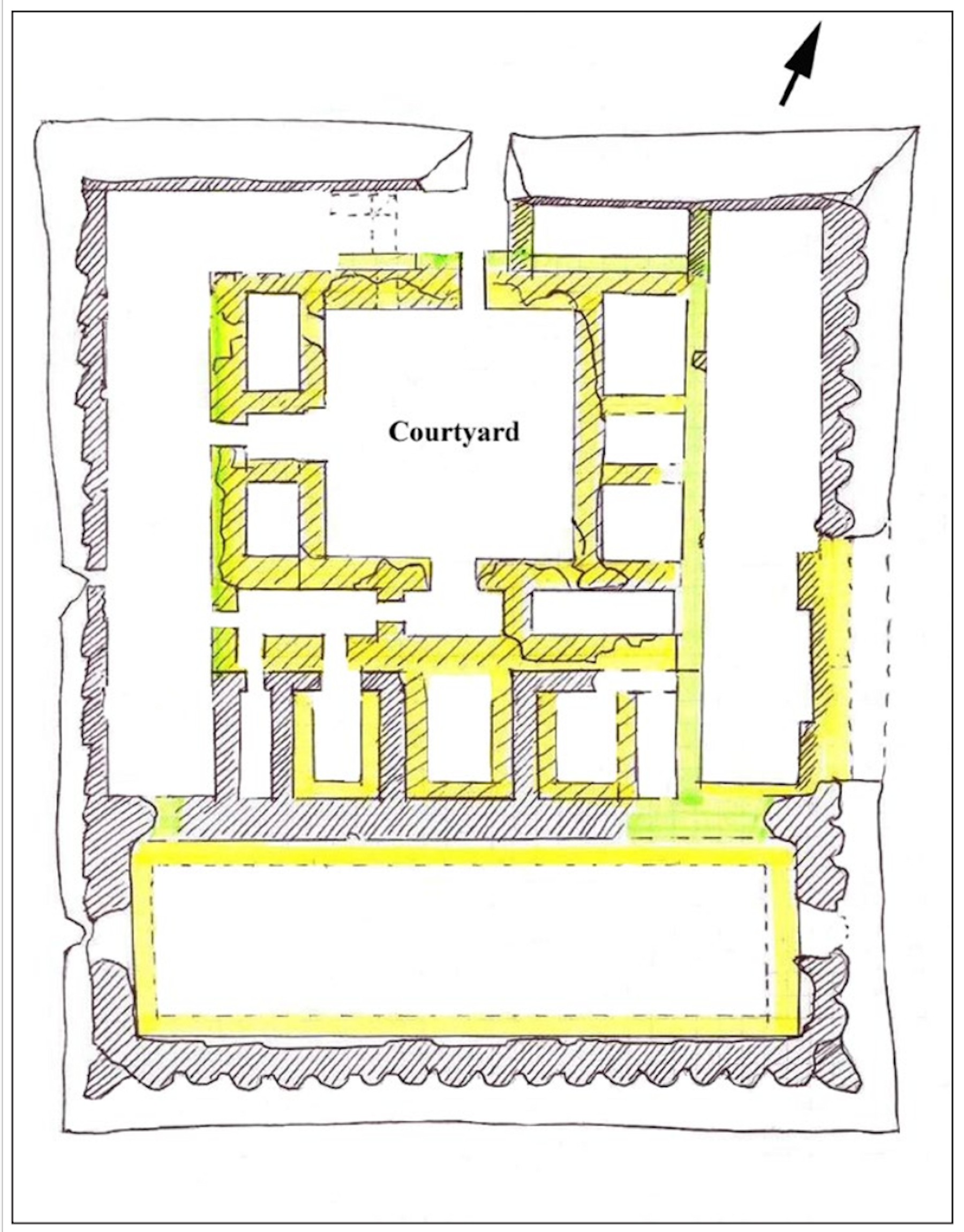
Great Kyz Kala plan.

== See also ==
- Desert castles of ancient Khorezm
- Qasr al-'Ashiq

== Sources ==
- Williams, Tim; Campbell, Katie; Jorayev, Gaygysyz; Wordsworth, Paul; Jepbarov, Rejep; Moriset, Sébastien (5 December 2018). "Semi-fortified Palatial Complexes in Central Asia: New Work at the Great Kyz Kala, Merv, Turkmenistan". Archaeology International. 21 (1): 154. doi:10.5334/ai-395.
