= Shikshin Temple =

Buddhist cave–temple site in Xinjiang, China

Qigexing Buddhist Temple Ruins
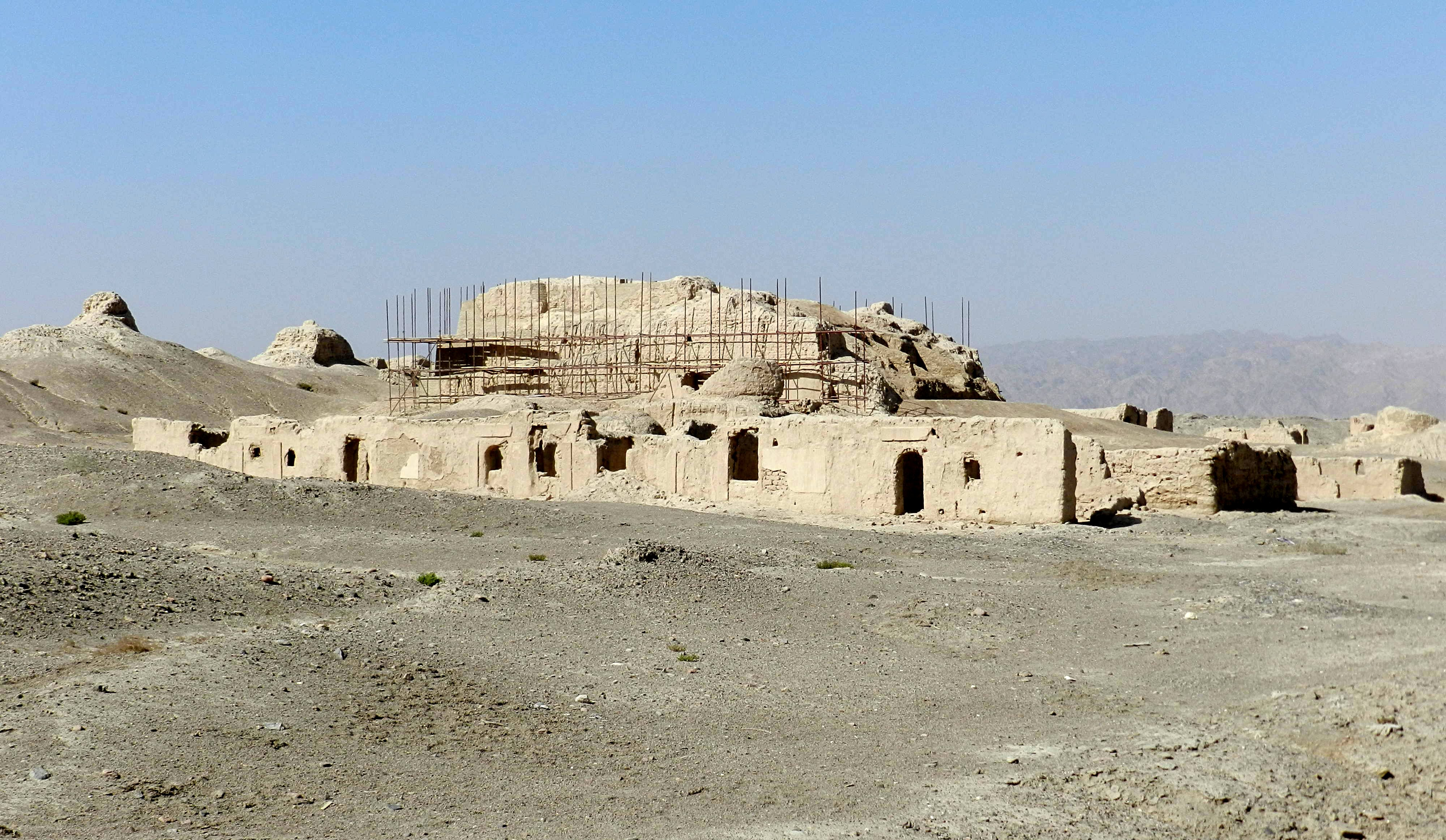
- View of the ruins

- Location of the site in Xinjiang, China Shikshin Temple (China)
- 41.936°N 86.341°E
- Location: Xinjiang, China

Site notes
- Condition: In ruins

The Shorchuk or Shikshin Temple (Uyghur: Хорчу, romanized: Xorqu; simplified Chinese: 七个星佛寺; traditional Chinese: 七個星佛寺; pinyin: Qīgèxīng Fósì; lit. 'Seven-Stars Buddhist Temple') is a ruined compound of Buddhist sites located about 25–30 km southwest of the town of Karasahr, Yanqi Hui Autonomous County, Xinjiang, China. The site was a major religious center along the northern route of the Silk Road in the second half of the first millennium CE. Another name for the site is Ming-oi (明屋, "The Thousand Houses") in Turkic.

== Names ==
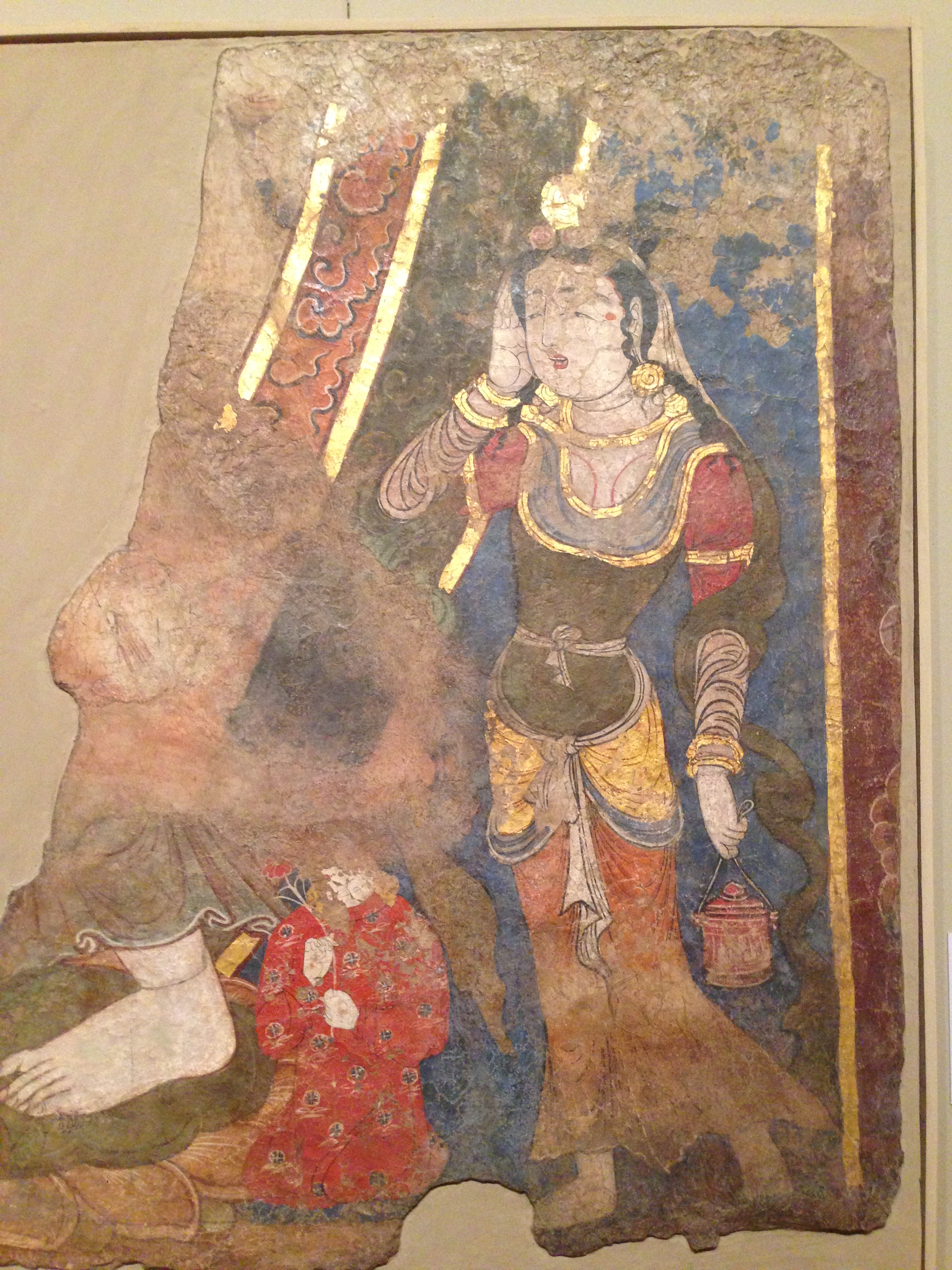
Mural depicting a woman with funerary urn.

The site's Chinese name "Qigexing" has also been spelled as "Shikchin", "Shikshin", "Šikšin", "Xikeqin", or "Xigexing". The archaeologist Albert Grünwedel who worked at the site during the third German Turfan expedition (1905–1907) referred to the site as "Šorčuq"(derived from the Uyghur name Xorqu), this name is also sometimes spelled as Shorchuk, "Chorchuk", or "Shorchuq" and may refer to salt deposits in the surrounding steppes. The site is also referred to as "Ming oi" or "Mingoi" (明屋), a term that literally means "Thousand Dwellings" in the Uyghur language and is also used for other temple sites in the region such as the Kizil Caves.

== History ==
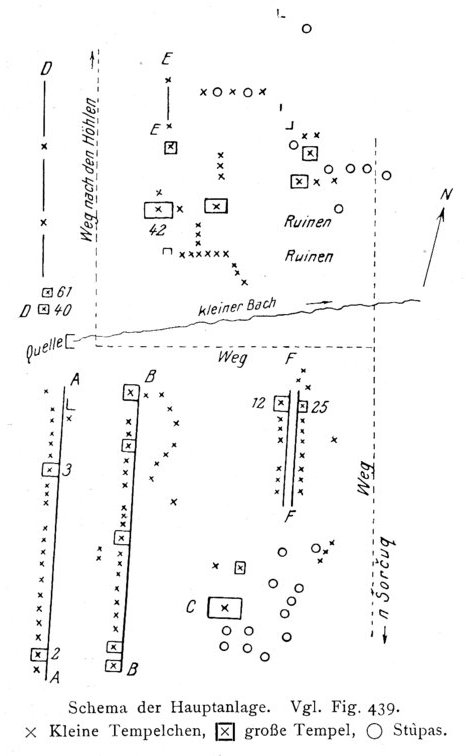
Map of the ruins of the Shorchuk/Qigexing site by Albert Grünwedel (1912), X: little temple, boxed X: large temple, o: stupas

Qigexing was part of the city state of Ārśi or Agni (now known as Karasahr/Qarasheher). Ārśi is believed to have been the homeland of an extinct Indo-European language known as "Tocharian A", or Agnean, and was significant in the introduction of Buddhism to China. As late as the 6th century CE, Buddhist works and official documents were being written in Tocharian A. Ārśi was mentioned in Chinese sources, as early as the Han dynasty, as the Kingdom of Yanqi (Chinese: 焉耆; pinyin: Yanqi or Yen-ch'i – a derivative of Ārśi/Agni).

Qigexing was conquered by the Han dynasty in 94 CE, during its reconquest of the Tarim Basin. The Buddhist monk Faxian visited the area of Yanqi around 400 CE and mentions the presence of about 4,000 monks who were practicing Hinayana Buddhism.

The monk Xuanzang, who lived in the 7th century CE, reports the existence of 10 Buddhist monasteries with 2,000 monks who belonged to the Sarvastivada school of Buddhism in the area around Yanqi. In 644 CE, the Tang dynasty invaded and annexed Yanqi during their wars against the Western Turks, a conflict that would last until the Turks were defeated in 657 CE. Tang control of the kingdom was re-established in 648 CE when a Tang general defeated a usurper who had deposed the puppet ruler that the Tang installed four years before. In 719 CE, the Tang established one of the Four Garrisons of Anxi in Yanqi, the other garrisons were in Kucha, Kashgar, and Hotan. Aurel Stein hypothesized that the Buddhist temples of Qigexing were burned during an iconoclasm after Islam became the state religion of the Kara-Khanid Khanate.

Archeological finds in Qigexing include the ruins of larger temple compounds (with more than 100 buildings in total) as well as twelve cave temples. The remains of some wall paintings and in particular sculptures have been discovered at the site. Sculptures have been found as individual figures as well as in friezes. The style of the artworks mixes indo-Iranian elements with Chinese styles. The depiction of human heads at the site has a characteristic style with faces that are bulged out like balloons. The Qigexing site is also an important source for manuscripts written in the East Tocharian language, also known as Tocharian A or Agnean, after Agni, an ancient name for Yanqi. Of the 1150 leaves and fragments in East Tocharian that were included in a 2007 survey, 383 came from a single scriptorum in Qigexing.

The site was investigated by Albert Grünwedel during the third German Turfan expedition (1905–1907), by Aurel Stein in December 1907, as well as by Sergey Oldenburg during the Russian Turkistan Expedition (1909–1910).

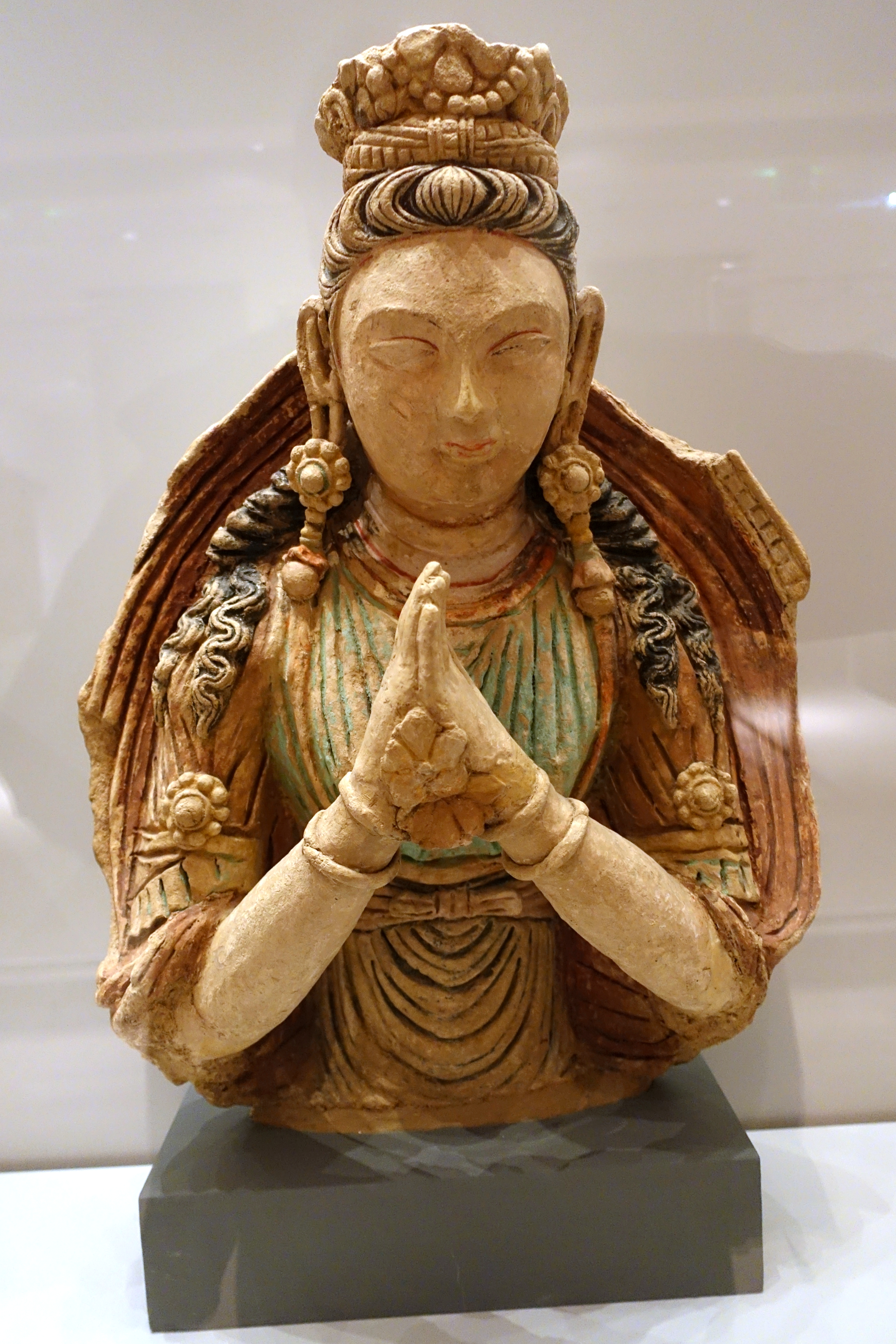
Statue from Shikshin Temple, Nakshatra Cave, 5th-6th century CE

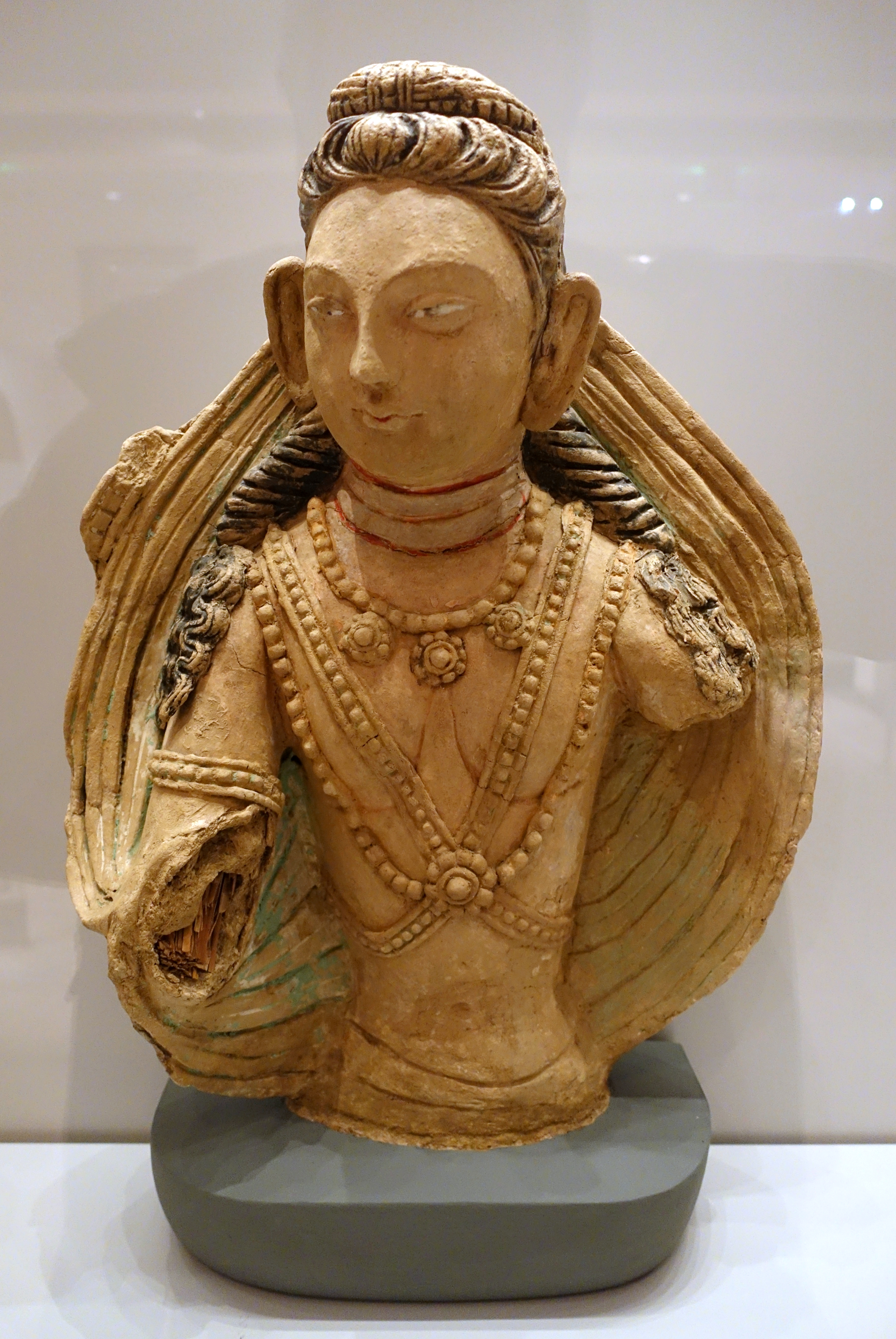
Statue from Shikshin Temple, Nakshatra Cave, 5th-6th century CE

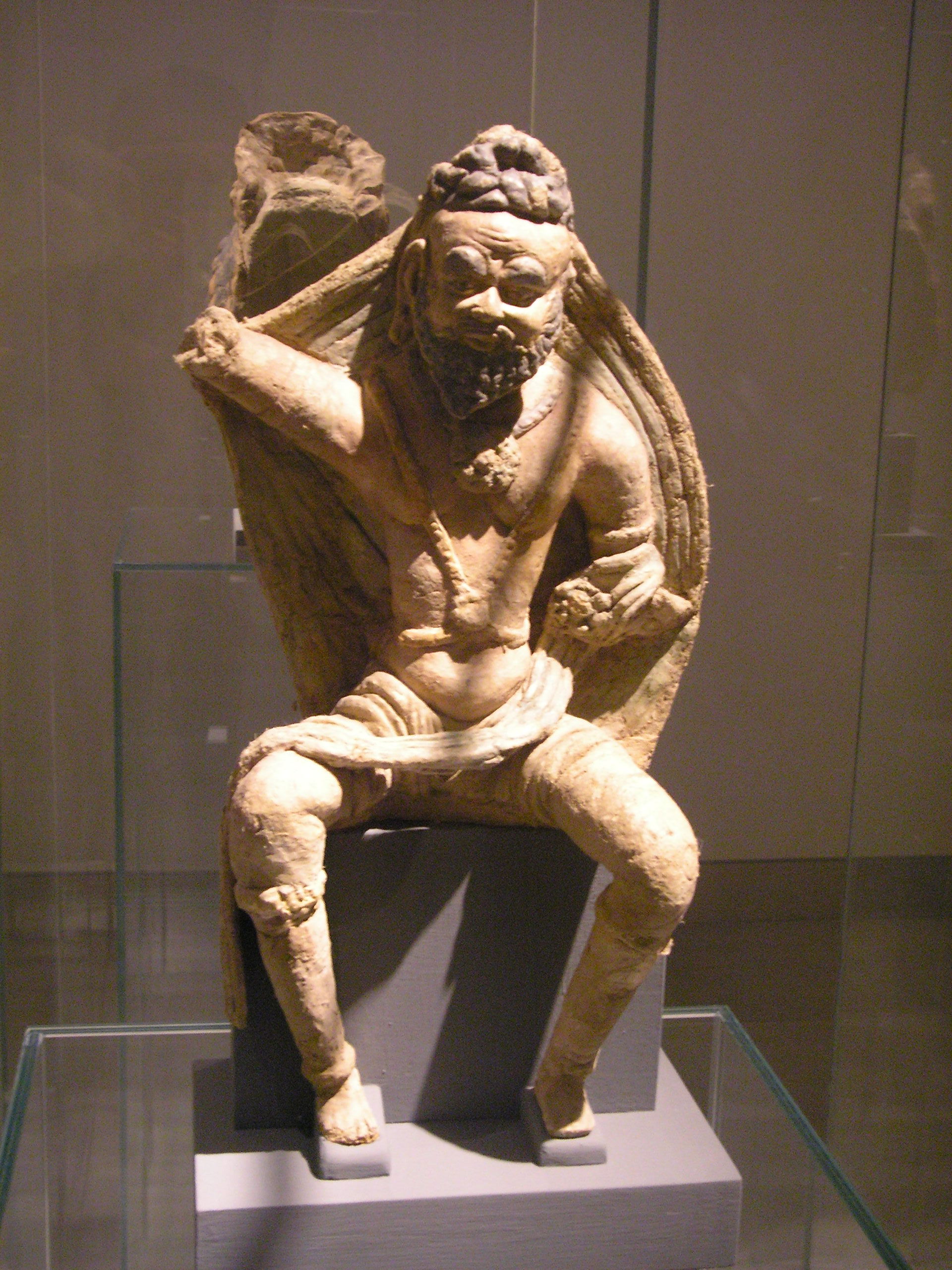
A King in sculpture from Qigexing (possibly 8th century CE).

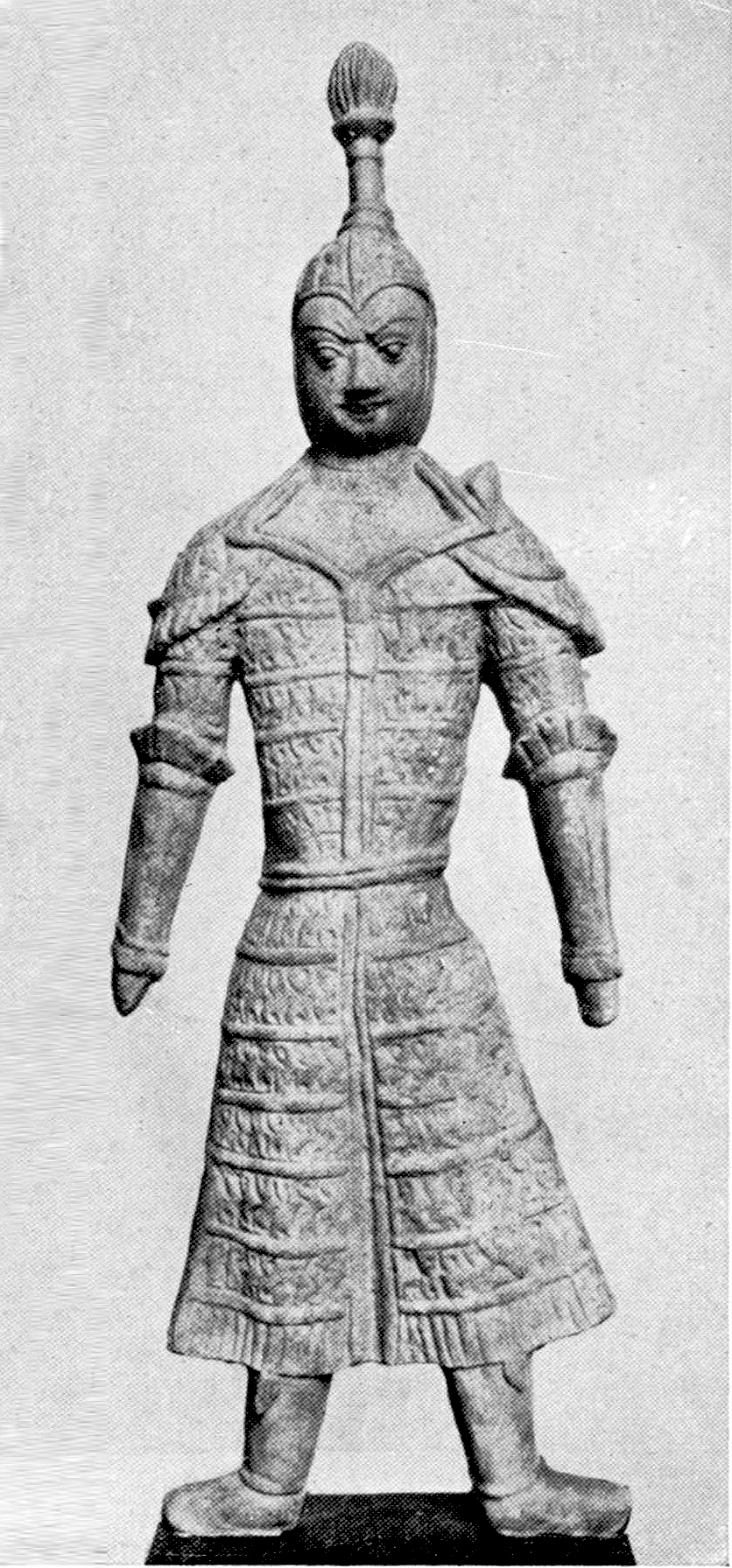
Turk soldier in armour, Shorchuk, 8th century CE.

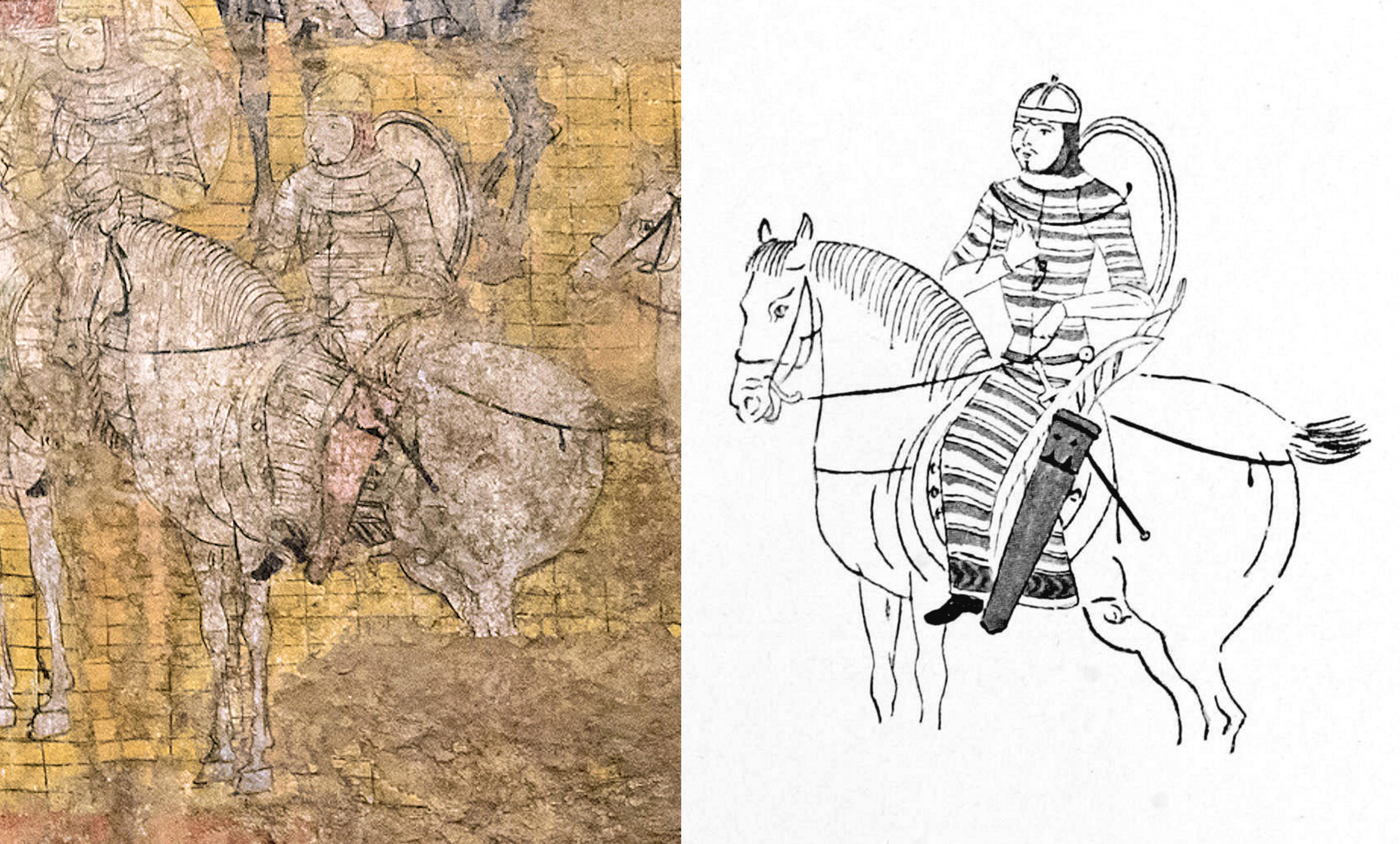
Knight in armour in the Buddhist depiction of the War of the Relics, Shorchuk, Karashahr, 8th century CE.

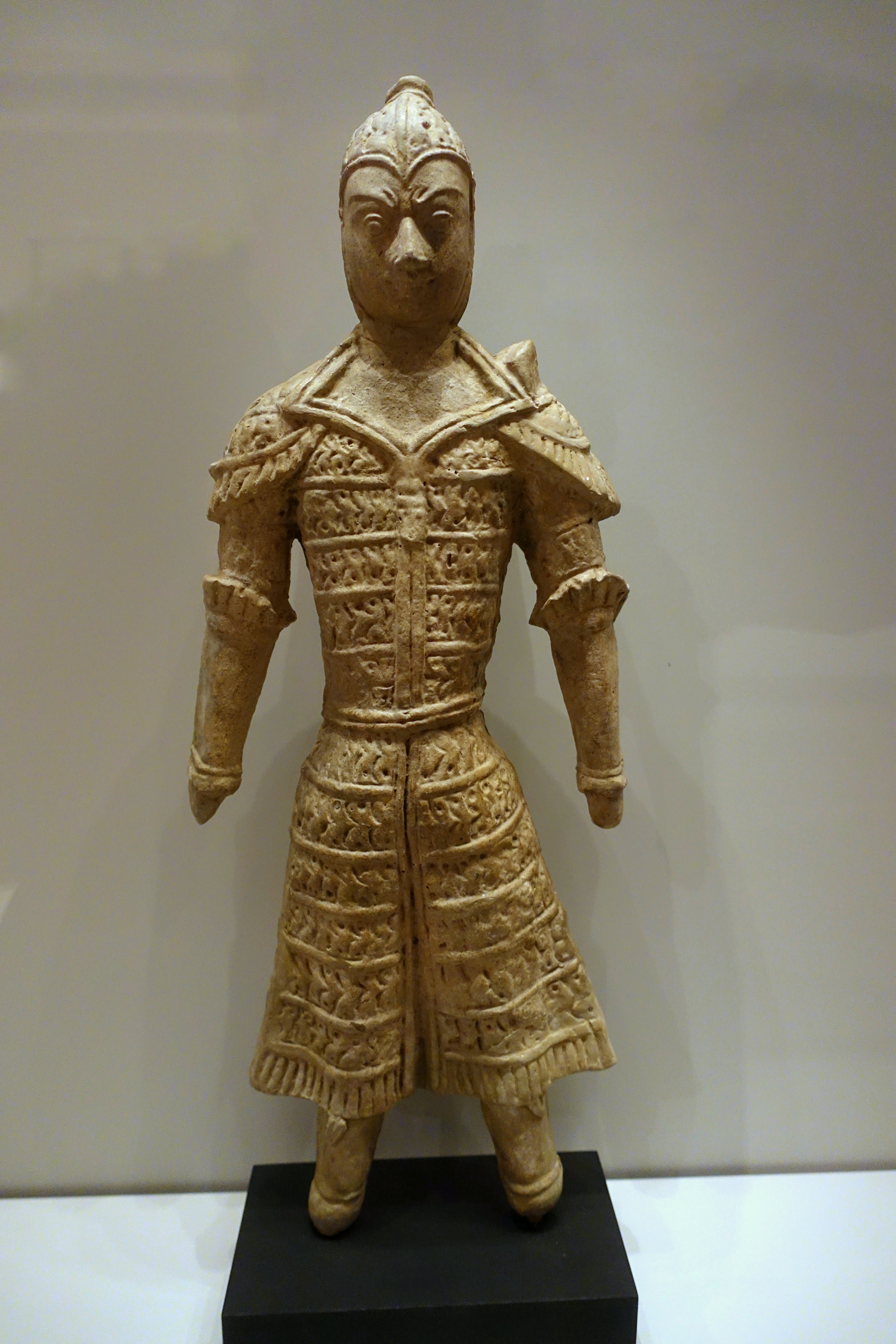
Soldier cast, made from molds from Shorchuk, Volkerkunde Museum, Berlin

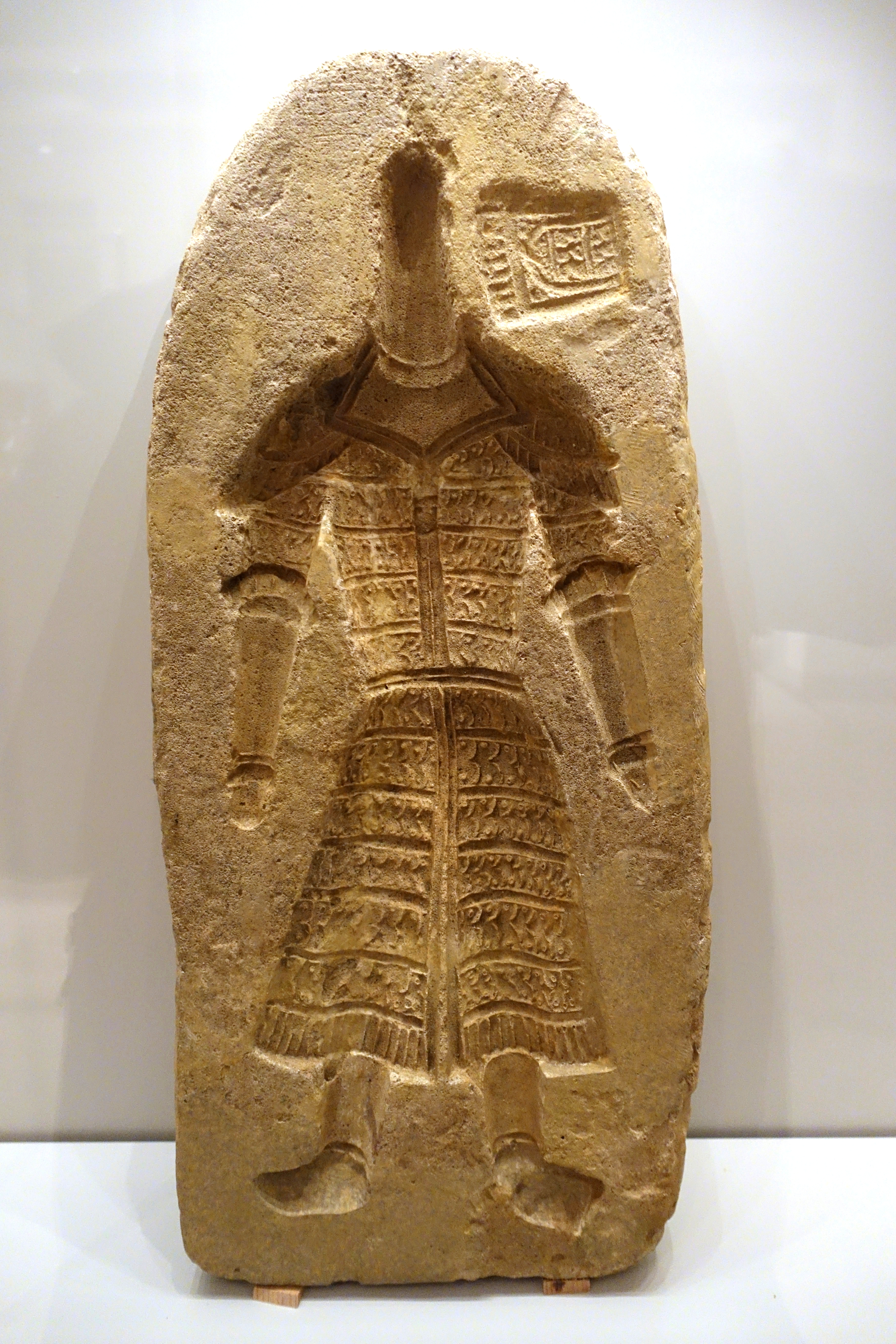
Soldier mold, Shorchuk, Volkerkunde Museum, Berlin

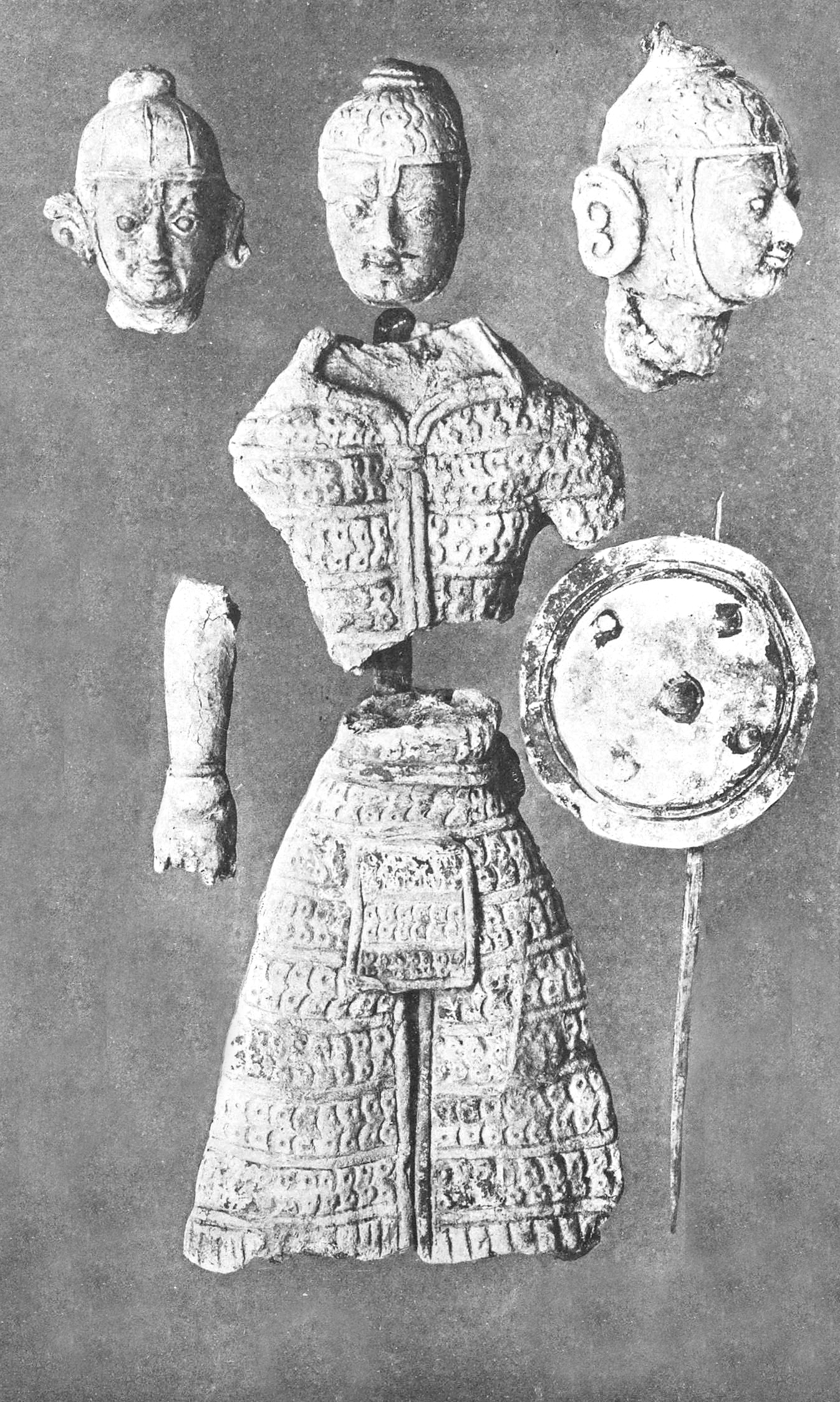
Shorchuk warrior statuette of a Central Asian soldier, late 5th-7th century.

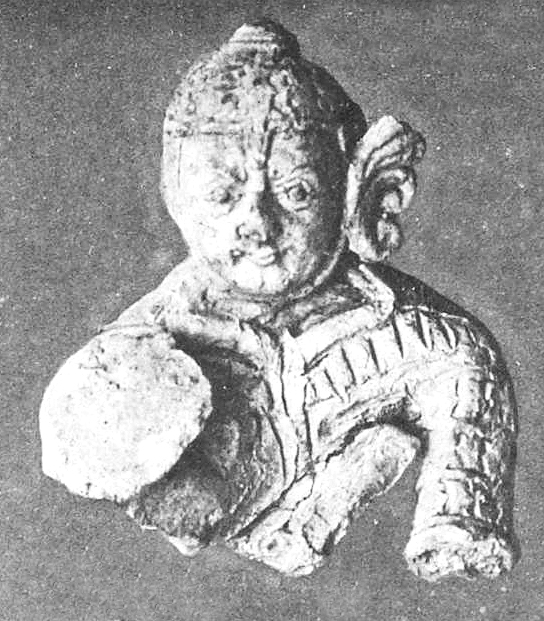
Shorchuk soldier statuette, Tang dynasty, 6th-7th century.

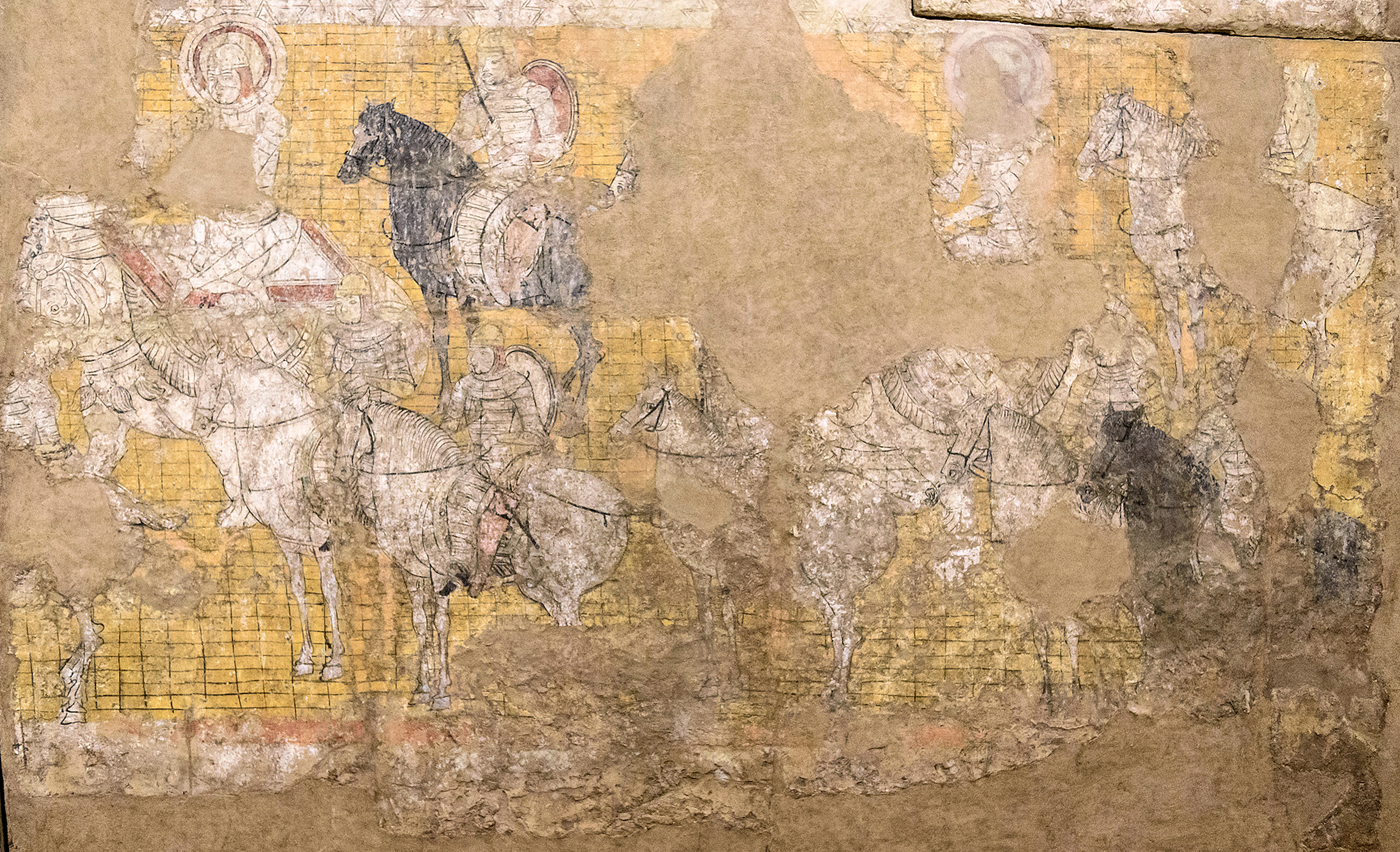
Wall painting of the Distribution of Relics, detail of the warriors Cave 11 (Grunwedel Cave 9), cave temple site, Shorchuk Ming-oi, Karashahr, Hermitage Museum.
