= South Punjab =

South Punjab may refer to:

- South Punjab (region of Pakistan), the southern part of the region of Punjab in South Asia
- Malwa (Punjab), the southern region of Indian Punjab
- Saraikistan, also known as South Punjab Province, a proposed province in Pakistan

== See also ==
- Punjab (disambiguation)
- Southern Punjab cricket team (disambiguation)
- Bahawalpur South Punjab, another proposed province in Pakistan
