= Panj (disambiguation) =

Panj is a city in Tajikistan. Panj may also refer to:

- Panj (river), on the border between Tajikistan and Afghanistan
- Panj District, Khatlon Province, Tajikistan
- Panj Free Economic Zone, Khatlon Province
- Panj, Iran, a village in Isfahan Province

== See also ==
- Panja (disambiguation)
- Punjab (disambiguation)
