= Takht-i Kuwad =

Tajikistan archeological site

Coordinates: 37.053819°N 68.281938°E

Takht-i Kuwad

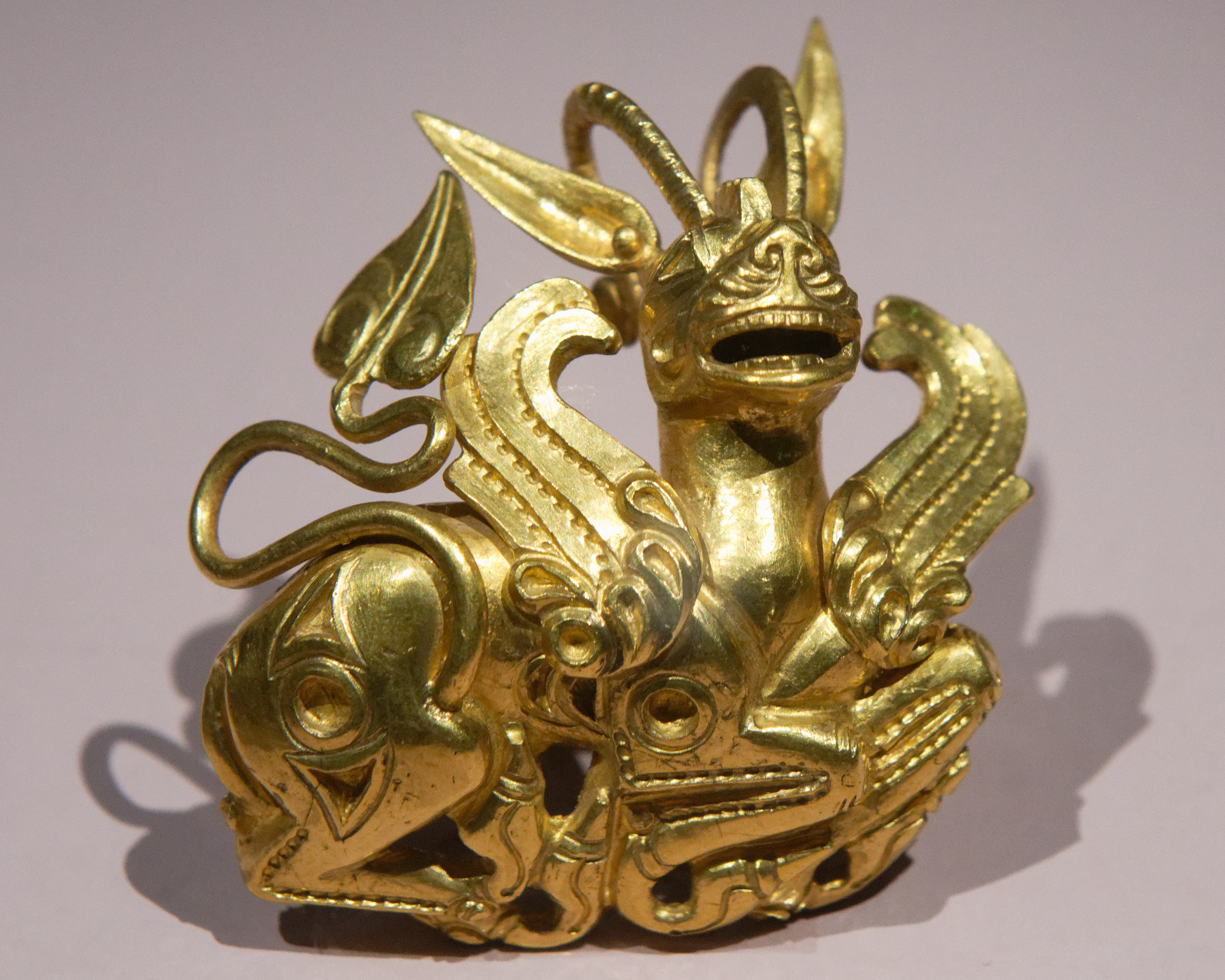
Horned lion, Oxus Treasure

Location of Takht-i Kuwad in Central Asia.
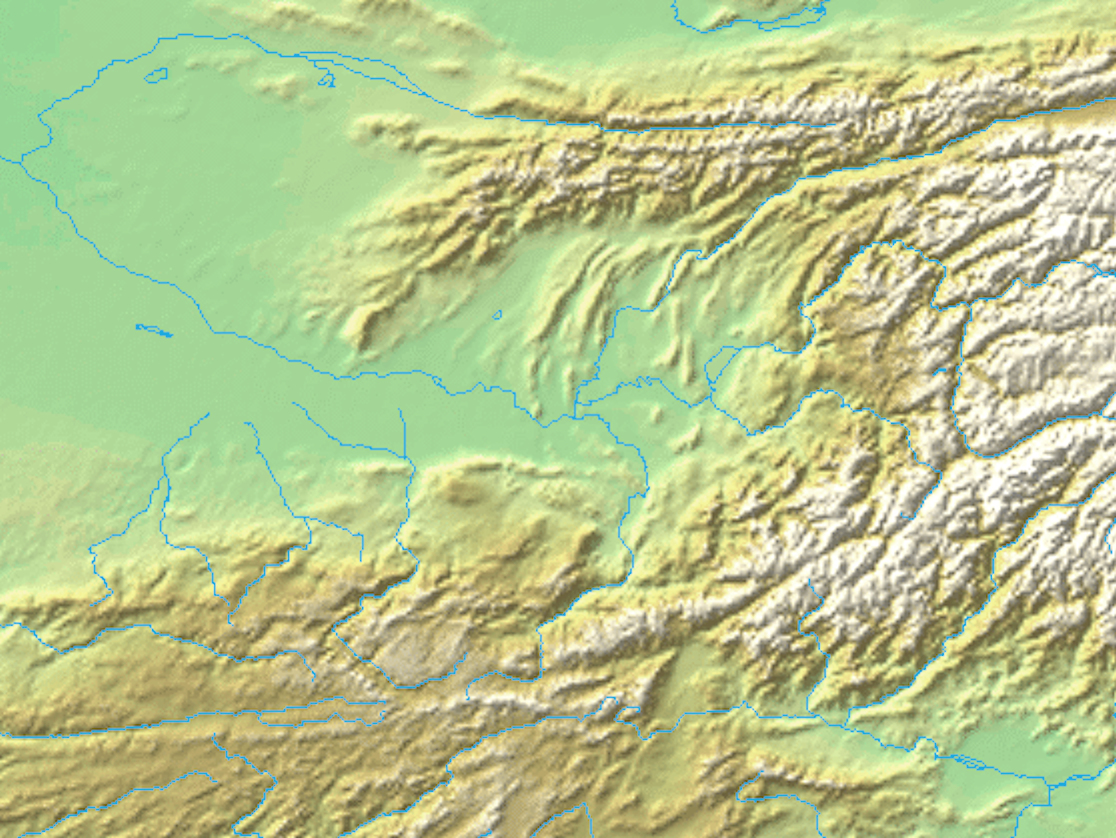
Takht-i Kuwad (Bactria)
Takht-i Kuwad (Tajikistan)

Takht-i Kuwad ("throne" or "platform of Kuwad"), also Takht-i Kuwat, Kawat, Kuad, Kawadian or Kobadian, is an archaeological site in the Kubodiyon district, Tajikistan. It is located near the junction of the Vakhsh and Pyandzh rivers, which continue they course as the Amu Darya (ancient Oxus).

It is generally considered as the original findspot of the Oxus Treasure, which dates from the 6th to the 4th century BC. The first mention in print of the treasure was an article in a Russian newspaper in 1880, written by a Russian general who in 1879 was in the area enquiring into the Trans-Caspian railway that the Russians had just begun to construct. He recounted that local reports said that treasure had been found in the ruins of an ancient fort called "Takht-i Kuwad", which was sold to Indian merchants.

The site is close to, but different from Takht-i Sangin. The site of Takht-i Sangin is immediately south of the point where the Vakhsh / Amu Darya river (the ancient Oxus) is met by the Panj river (the ancient Ochus), about five kilometres north of Takht-i Kuvad.

== Sources ==
- Curtis, John, "Franks and the Oxus Treasure", pp.230-249 in M. Caygill & J. Cherry (eds), 'A.W. Franks. Nineteenth-century collecting and the British Museum', London 1997.
- Curtis, John, The Oxus Treasure, British Museum Objects in Focus series, 2012, British Museum Press, ISBN 9780714150796
- Curtis, John, "The Oxus Treasure in the British Museum", Ancient Civilizations from Scythia to Siberia, Vol. 10 (2004), pp.293–338
- Lindström, Gunvor (2021). "Southern Tajikistan". In Mairs, Rachel (ed.). The Graeco-Bactrian and Indo-Greek world. Abingdon, Oxfordshire: Routledge. pp. 291–295. ISBN 9781138090699.
