= Pyandzh =

Pyandzh or Pyandj or Panj may refer to:

- Panj, a city in southern Tajikistan, formerly known as Baumanabad and Kirovabad.
- Panj River, a river between Tajikistan and Afghanistan
