= Punjab (disambiguation) =

The Punjab region is an area of South Asia stretching from central and eastern Pakistan to northwest India.

Punjab or Panjab may also refer to:

== Places ==
=== Punjab ===
- Punjab, India, a state in India forming the eastern part of the Punjab region
- Punjab, Pakistan, a province of Pakistan forming the western part of the Punjab region
- Punjab Province (British India) (1849–1947), a former province of British India

=== Others ===
- Panjab District, Afghanistan, in Bamyan province of Afghanistan
  - Panjab, Afghanistan, the capital of Panjab District
- Panjab, Iran, a village in Amol County of Mazandaran province

== Other uses ==
- Panjab Ali Biswas, Bangladeshi politician
- Punjab, a character in Little Orphan Annie
- Punjab circuit, a Hindi film distribution circuit in India

== See also ==
- Eastern Punjab (disambiguation), the part of the British Punjab Province which became part of India after partition
  - East Punjab (state) (1947–1966)
  - Patiala and East Punjab States Union (1948–1956), a former state of modern India
- Central Punjab (disambiguation)
- Northern Punjab
- Northern Punjab cricket team, Indian cricket team
- Punjab Assembly (disambiguation)
- Punjab cricket team (disambiguation)
- Punjab Hill States Agency (1936–1947), an administrative unit of British India
- Punjab Province (disambiguation)
- Punjab Rangers, border security officers in Pakistan
- Punjab States Agency (1930–1947), an administrative unit of British India
- Punjab University (disambiguation)
- Punjabi (disambiguation)
- South Punjab (disambiguation)
- Western Punjab (disambiguation), the part of the British Punjab Province which became part of Pakistan as a province after partition
  - West Punjab Province (1947–1955)
  - Bahawalpur (princely state), a princely state of British India and later Pakistan
- Panj (disambiguation)
- Ab (disambiguation)
