= Punjab Province =

Punjab Province may refer to:

- Punjab Province (British India), a former province of British India from 1849 to 1947

== In India ==
- Punjab, India, the modern-day Punjab state in India from 1966 onward
- East Punjab, a province and later a state of India from 1947 to 1966

== In Pakistan ==
- Punjab, Pakistan, the modern-day Punjab province in Pakistan from 1970 onward
- West Punjab, a province of Pakistan from 1947 to 1955

== See also ==
- Punjab region
- Punjab (disambiguation)
