= Punjabi =

Punjabi, or Panjabi, most often refers to:

- Something of, from, or related to Punjab, a region in Pakistan and India
  - Punjabi language
  - Punjabi dialects
  - Punjabi people
  - Punjabi culture
  - Punjabi cuisine
  - Punjabi music
  - Punjabi clothing
  - Punjabi diaspora

Punjabi may also refer to:

- Punjabi (horse), a British Thoroughbred racehorse
- HMS Punjabi, a British destroyer deployed during World War II
- Panjabi MC, British Indian musician
- Kurta, a garment known in parts of South Asia as a panjabi
- "Punjabi", a 2017 song by Timmy Trumpet and Dimatik
- Punjabi Bagh, a neighbourhood of West Delhi, Delhi, India
  - Punjabi Bagh metro station
  - Punjabi Bagh West metro station

== People with the surname ==
- Archie Panjabi (born 1972), British-Indian actress
- Kamya Panjabi (born 1979), Indian actress
- Manoj Punjabi (born 1972), Indian-Indonesian film producer
- Raam Punjabi (born 1943), Indian-Indonesian film and television producer, uncle of Manoj
- Prabal Panjabi, Indian actor

== See also ==
- Punjab (disambiguation)
- Eastern Punjabi (disambiguation)
- Western Punjabi (disambiguation)
- Indian Punjabi (disambiguation)
- Pakistani Punjabi (disambiguation)
