= Oxus Treasure =

Treasure found by the Oxus river, Tajikistan

Coordinates: 37.054553°N 68.281994°E

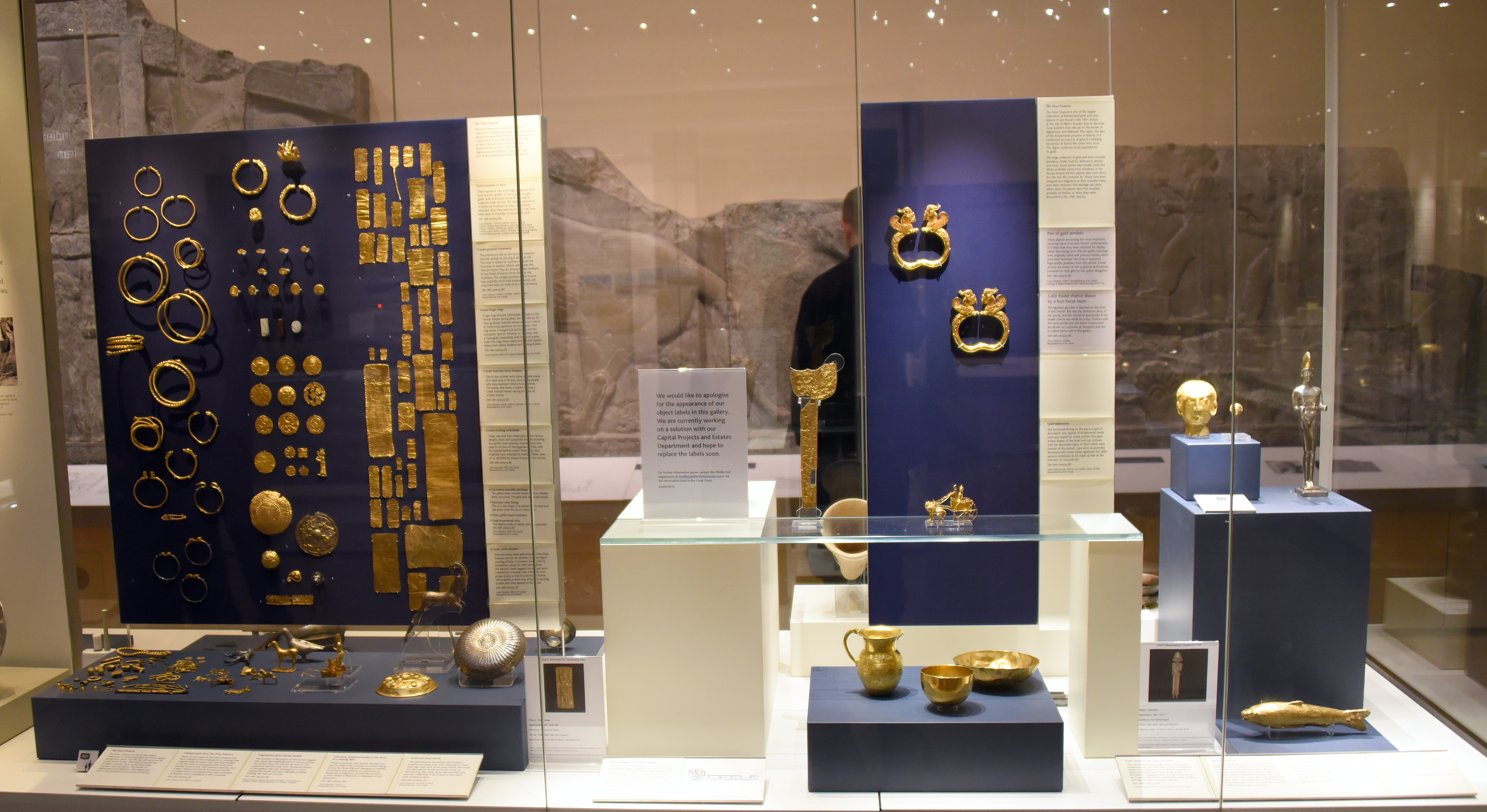
The Oxus Treasure at Room 52, the British Museum

The Oxus treasure (Persian: گنجینه آمودریا) is a collection of about 180 surviving pieces of metalwork in gold and silver, most relatively small, and around 200 coins, from the Achaemenid Persian period which were found by the Oxus river about 1877–1880. The exact place and date of the find remain unclear, but is often proposed as being near Kobadiyan. It is likely that many other pieces from the hoard were melted down for bullion; early reports suggest there were originally some 1500 coins, and mention types of metalwork that are not among the surviving pieces. The metalwork is believed to date from the sixth to fourth centuries BC, but the coins show a greater range, with some of those believed to belong to the treasure coming from around 200 BC. The most likely origin for the treasure is that it belonged to a temple, where votive offerings were deposited over a long period. How it came to be deposited is unknown.

As a group, the treasure is the most important survival of what was once an enormous production of Achaemenid work in precious metal. It displays a wide range of quality of execution, with the many gold votive plaques mostly crudely executed, some perhaps by the donors themselves, while other objects are of superb quality, presumably that expected by the court.

The British Museum now has nearly all the surviving metalwork, with one of the pair of griffin-headed bracelets on loan from the Victoria and Albert Museum, and displays them in Room 52. The group arrived at the museum by different routes, with many items bequeathed to the nation by Augustus Wollaston Franks. The coins are more widely dispersed, and more difficult to firmly connect with the treasure. A group believed to come from it is in the Hermitage Museum in Saint Petersburg, and other collections have examples.

== Objects ==
Achaemenid style arose rapidly with the very quick growth of the huge empire, which swallowed up the artistic centres of the ancient Near East and much of the Greek world, and mixed influences and artists from these. Although continuing influences from these sources can often be detected the Achaemenids formed a distinct style of their own.

The griffin-headed bracelets from the hoard are typical of the 5th to 4th century BC court style of Achaemenid Persia. Bracelets of a similar form to ones from the treasure can be seen on reliefs from Persepolis being given as tribute, whilst Xenophon writes that armlets (among other things) were gifts of honour at the Persian court. Glass, enamel or semi-precious stone inlays within the bracelets' hollow spaces have now been lost.

Sir John Boardman regards the gold scabbard, decorated with tiny figures showing a lion hunt, as pre-Achaemenid Median work of about 600 BC, drawing on Assyrian styles, though other scholars disagree, and the British Museum continues to date it to the 5th or 4th centuries.

The surviving objects, an uncertain proportion of the original finds, can be divided into a number of groups.

=== Sculptures ===
There are a number of small figurines, some of which may have been detached from larger objects. The single male figures appear to show worshippers rather than deities. The largest is most unusual for Persian art in showing a nude youth (in silver) standing in a formal pose, with a large conical hat covered in gold foil. The statuette shows Greek influence, in the figure and the fact of being nude, but is not typical of ancient Greek art. Two hollow gold heads of young males, rather crudely executed, probably belonged to composite statues with the main body in wood or some other material. One figure in silver and gold has a headdress that suggests he may be a king.

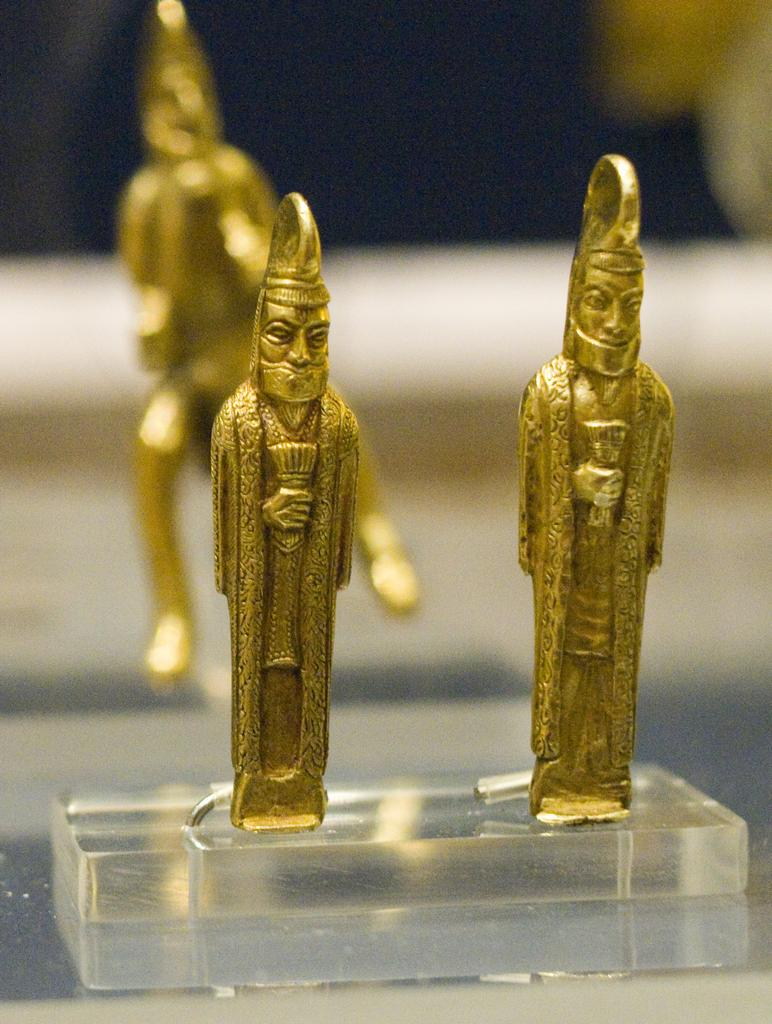
Gold statuettes carrying barsoms, with a rider behind

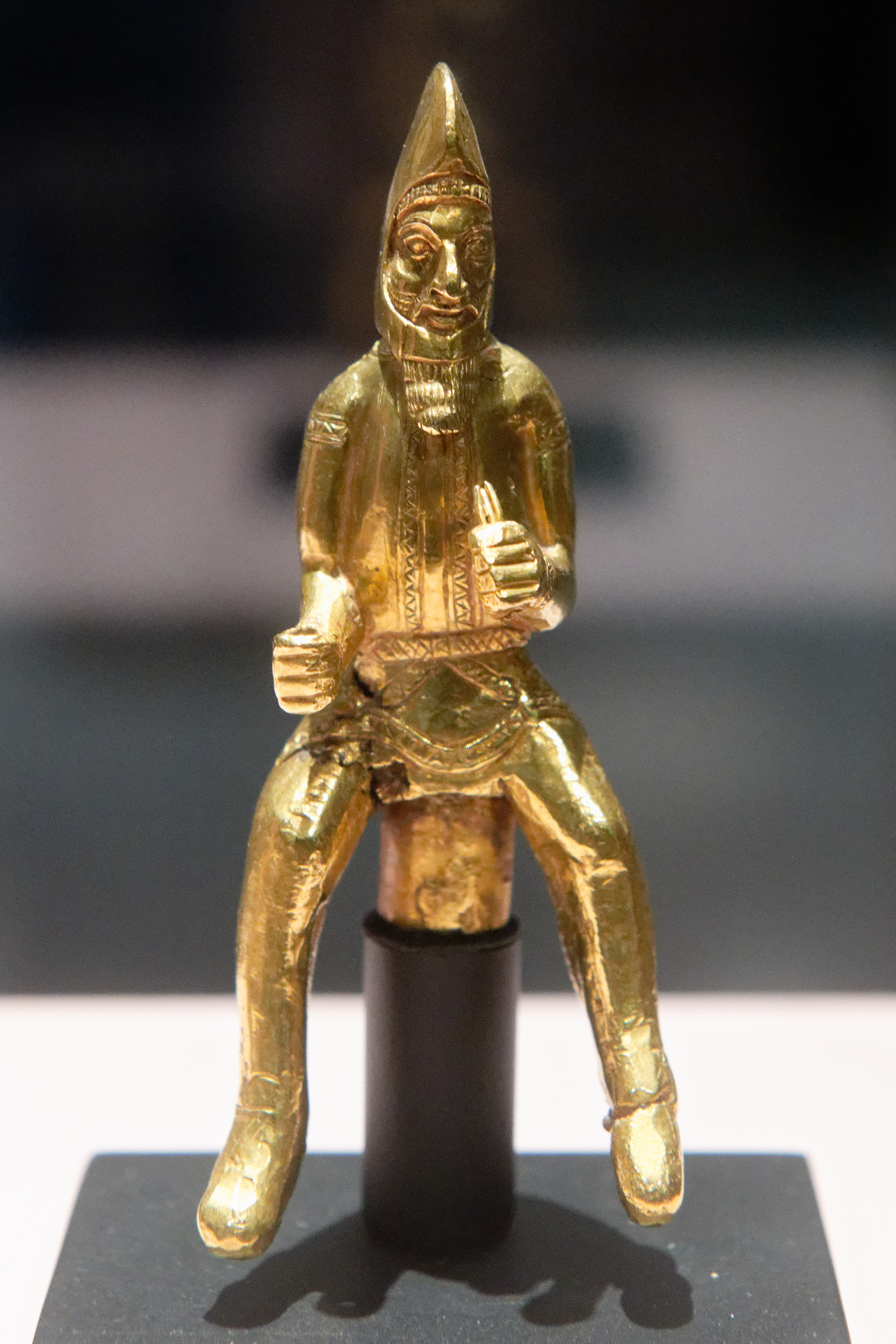
Gold statuette of a rider

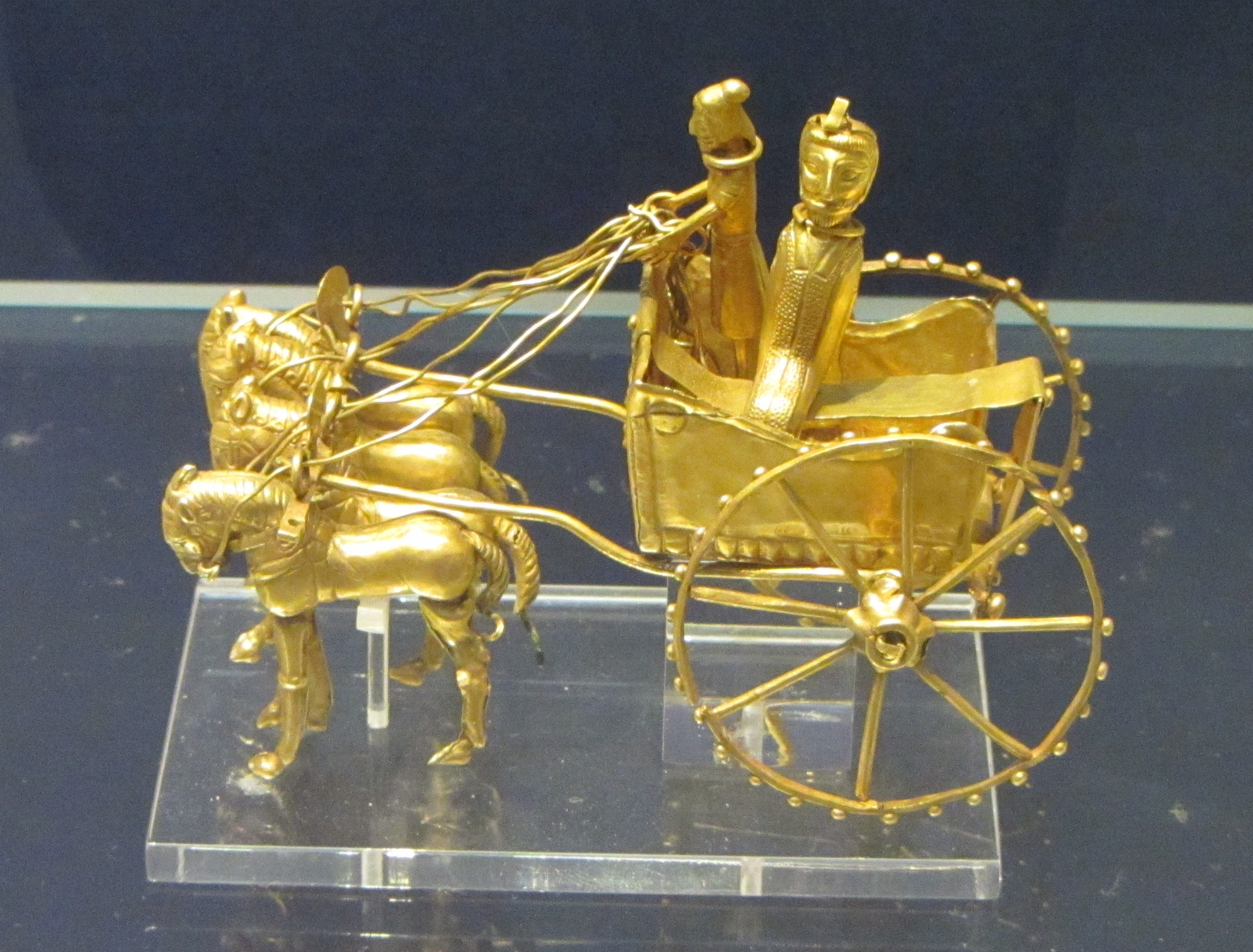
Gold model chariot

Other sculptural objects include two model chariots in gold, one incomplete, plus figures of a horse and a rider that may belong to this or other model groups, as may two other horses cut out from sheet gold. The wheels of the complete chariot would originally have turned freely, and it had received at least one repair in antiquity. It is pulled by four horses (rather small, and with only nine legs surviving between them) and carries two figures, a driver and a seated passenger, both wearing torcs. The chariot has handrails at the open rear to assist getting in and out, while the solid front carries the face of the protective Egyptian dwarf-god Bes. A leaping ibex was probably the handle of an amphora-type vase, and compares with handles shown on tribute vessels in the Persepolis reliefs, as well as an example now in the Louvre.

=== Jewellery and fittings ===
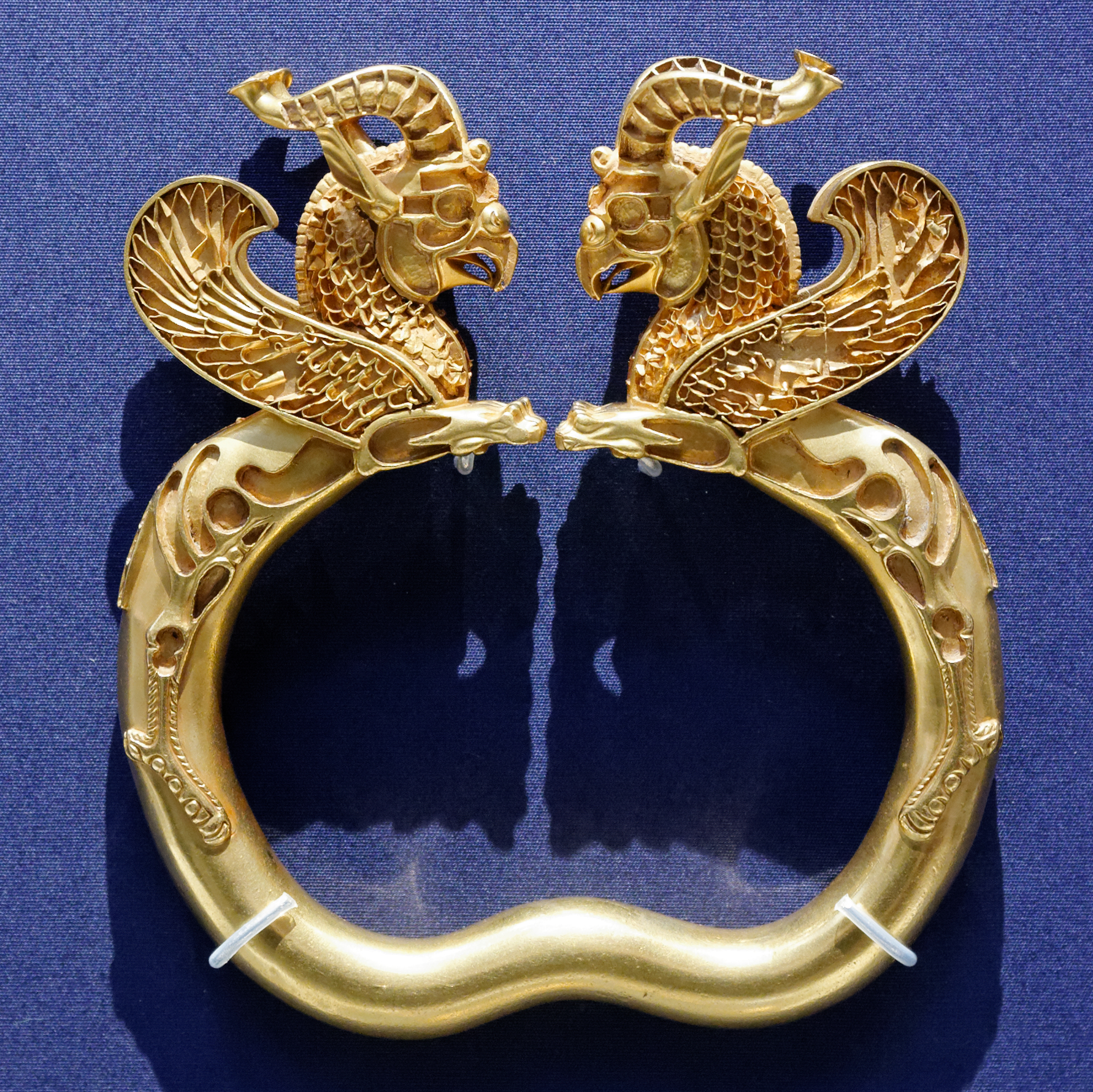
One of a pair of armlets from the Oxus Treasure, which has lost its inlays of precious stones or enamel

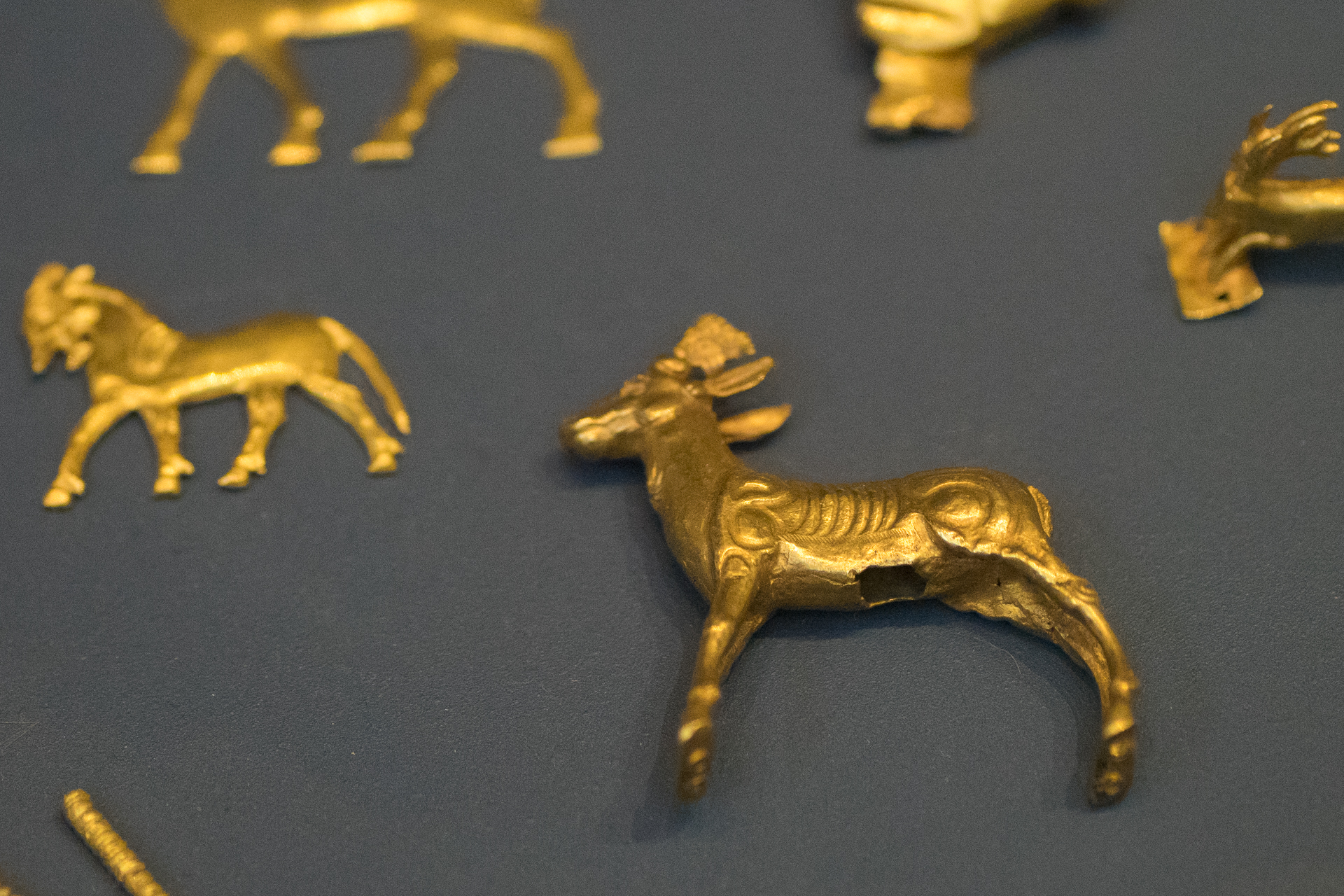
Gold animal statuettes from the Oxus Treasure

The two griffin-headed bracelets or armlets are the most spectacular pieces by far, despite lacking their stone inlays. There are a number of other bracelets, some perhaps torcs for the neck, several with simpler animal head terminals variously depicting goats, ibex, sheep, bulls, ducks, lions, and fantastic creatures. Many have inlays, or empty cells for them; it used to be thought that this technique was acquired from Ancient Egyptian jewellery (as in some of Tutankhamun's grave goods), but Assyrian examples are now known. There are 12 finger rings with flat bezels engraved for use as signet rings, and two stone cylinder seals, one finely carved with a battle scene.

The griffin-headed bracelets were also the most complex objects to manufacture, being cast in several elements, then worked in many different techniques, and soldered together. Some of the surfaces are very thin, and show signs of damage, and in one place repair with a soldered patch.

A "Gold plaque in the form of a lion-griffin, with the body of an ibex and a leaf-shaped tail", with missing inlay, has two prongs behind for attaching it, and may have been an ornament for a cap or the hair, or part of an object. The animal's legs are folded beneath its body in a way characteristic of the Scythian animal style of the southern Russian steppes, an influence also seen in other pieces such a ring with a lion.

A stylized birds-head ornament can be recognised, like the finely-decorated scabbard of "Median" shape, as very similar to that of a soldier from a Persepolis relief, where it forms the crest to his bow-case. These seem to be the only items relating to weapons, though other pieces may have decorated horse harness. Another group of plaques were probably bracteates intended to be sewn onto clothing through the small holes round their edges. These have a variety of motifs, including the face of the Egyptian dwarf-god Bes, lion-griffins, a sphinx, and a cut-out figure apparently showing a king (see illustration below; Bes is centre in the top row, the king at bottom right).

=== Votive plaques ===
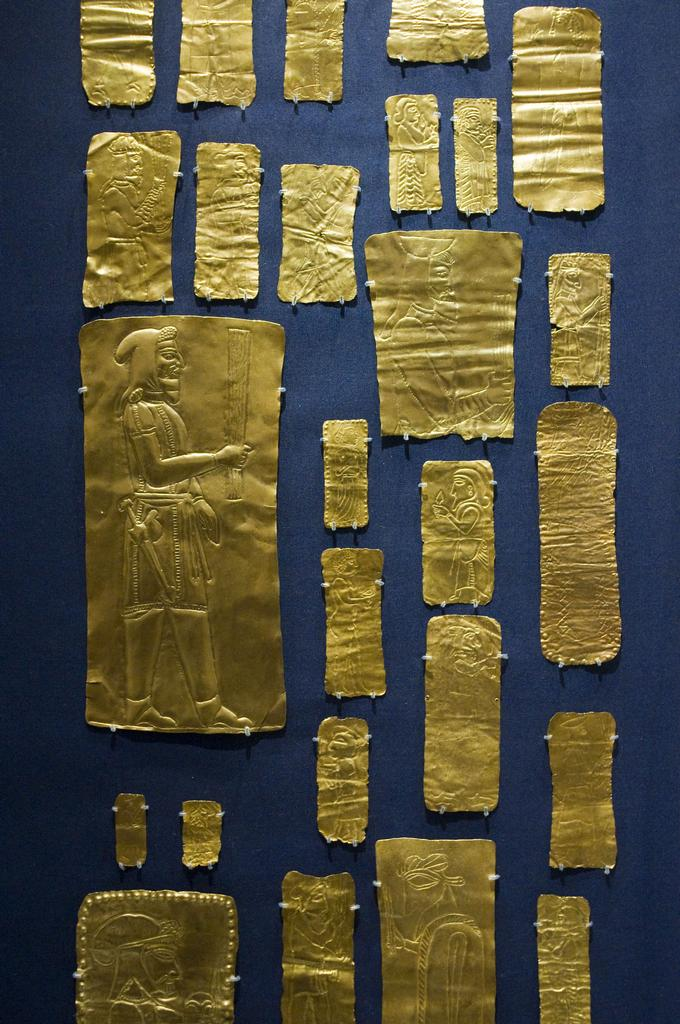
Votive plaques

The British Museum has 51 thin gold plaques with incised designs, which are regarded as votive plaques left by devotees at a temple as an offering to the deity. They are mostly rectangular with the designs in a vertical format, and range from 2 to 20 cm (0.79 to 7.87 in) tall. Most show a single human figure facing left, many carrying a bunch of twigs called a barsom used in offerings; these probably represent the offeror. The dress of the figures shows the types known as "Median" and "Persian" to modern historians, and the quality of the execution is mostly relatively low, but varies greatly, with some appearing to have been incised by amateurs. Three show animals, a horse, a donkey and a camel; possibly it was their health that was the subject of the offering. One large figure is in shallow relief within its incised outline (illustrated).

=== Vessels ===
The London group includes bowls, a gold jug, and a handle from a vase or ewer in the form of a leaping ibex, which is similar to a winged Achaemenid handle in the Louvre. No rhyton drinking vessels were found, but the British Museum has two other Achaemenid examples, one ending in a griffin's head similar to that on the bracelets in the treasure. A hollow gold fish, apparently representing a species of carp found only in the Oxus, has a hole at its mouth and a loop for suspension; it may have contained oil or perfume, or hung as one of a group of pendants.

=== Coins ===
The association of surviving coins with the treasure is less generally accepted than for the other items, and O. M. Dalton of the British Museum, author of the monograph on the treasure, was reluctant to identify any specific coins as part of it, while Sir Alexander Cunningham (see below) disagreed, identifying about 200. The Russian scholar E.V. Zeymal associated 521 surviving coins with the treasure, without extending the terminus post quem for deposition of the treasure beyond Cunningham's figure of about 180 BC. The coins associated with the treasure include examples from various Achaemenid mints and dates, but also later ones from after the conquest of the Empire by Alexander the Great, with the latest being of the reigns of Antiochus the Great (r. 223–187 BC) and Euthydemus I of Bactria (r. c. 235–200 BC).

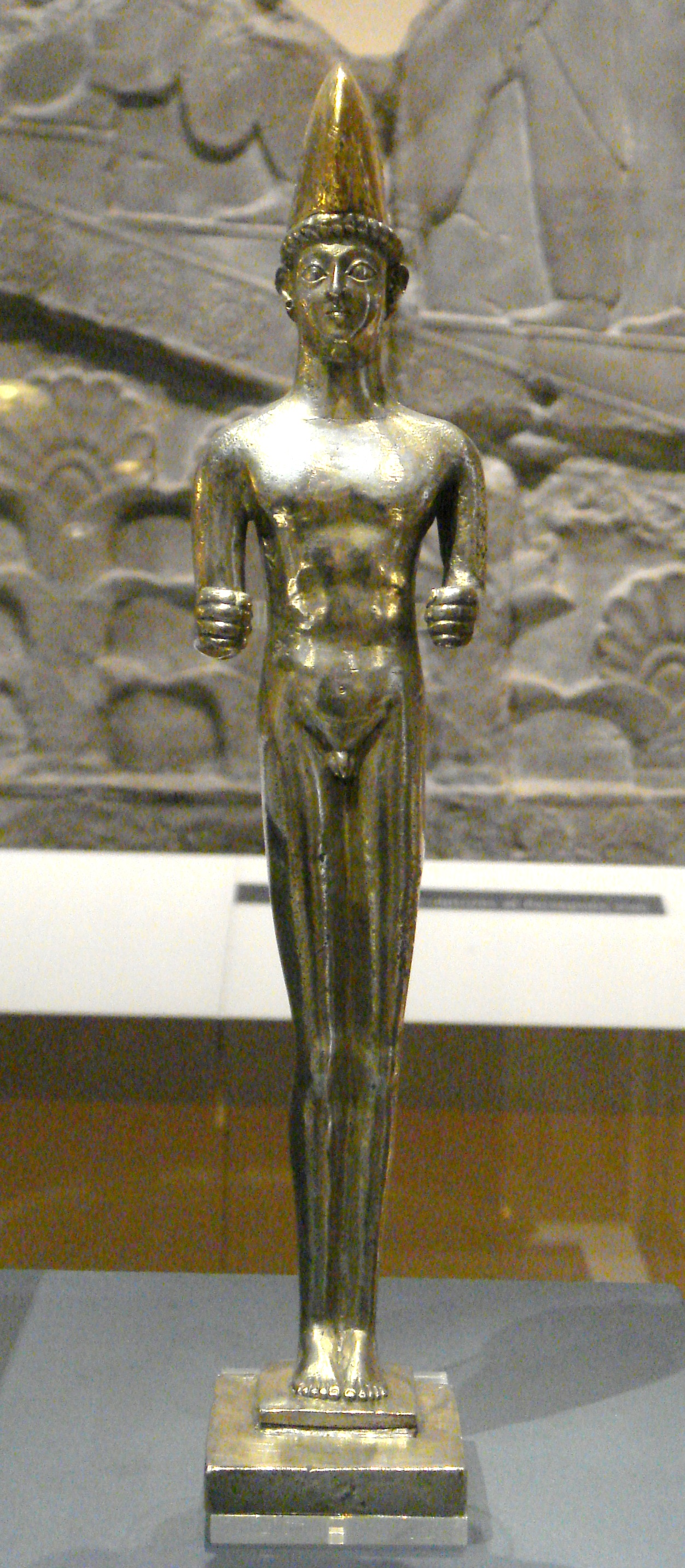
The statuette of the naked youth

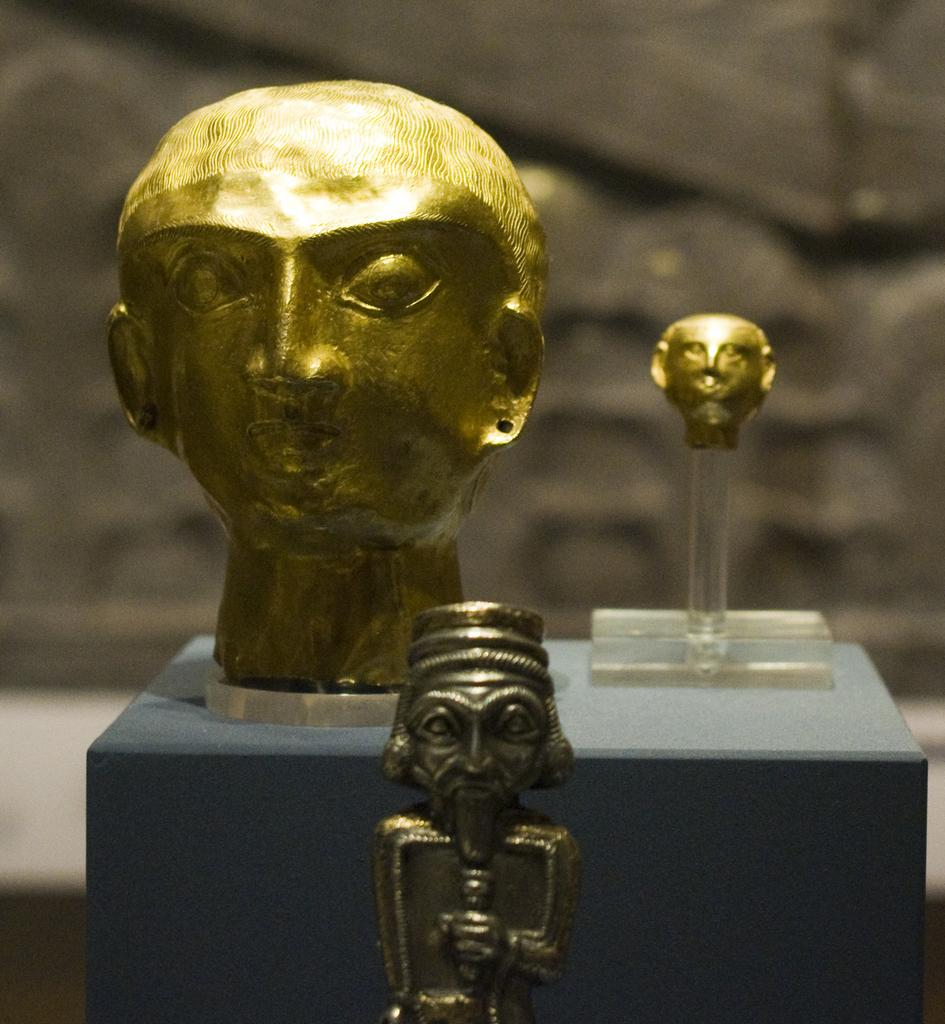
The two hollow heads, with the statuette perhaps of a king in front

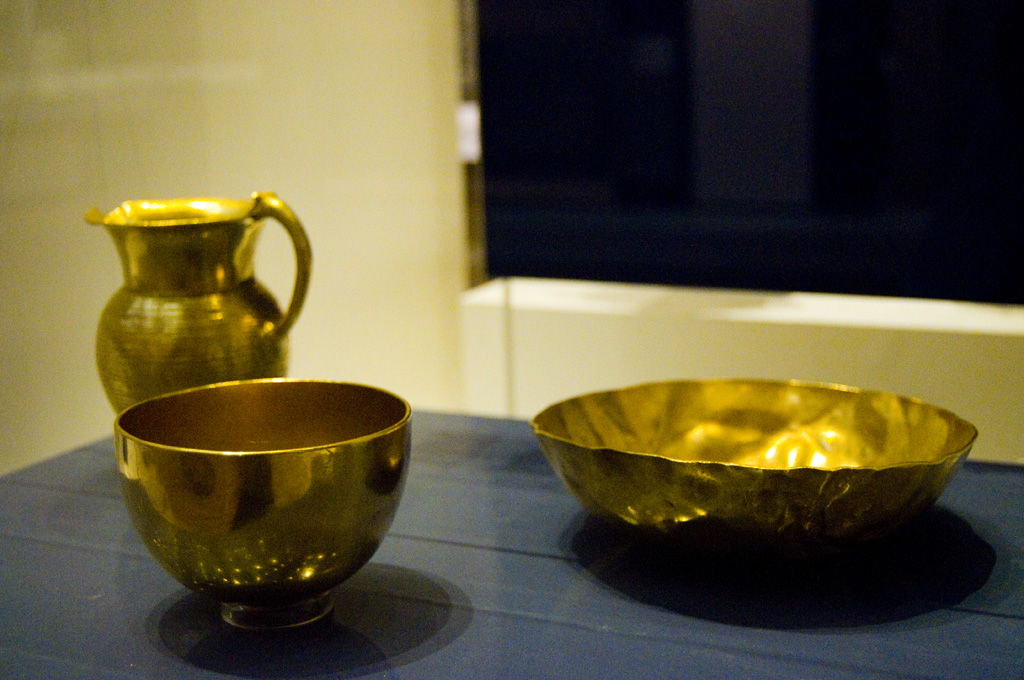
The jug and two bowls

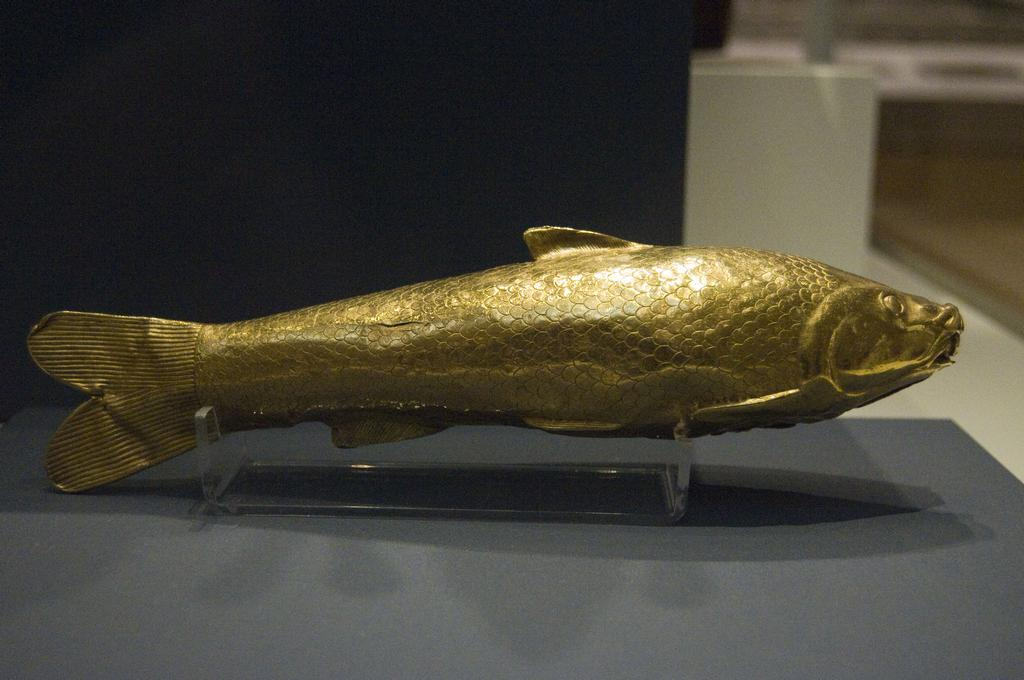
The gold fish vessel

== History ==
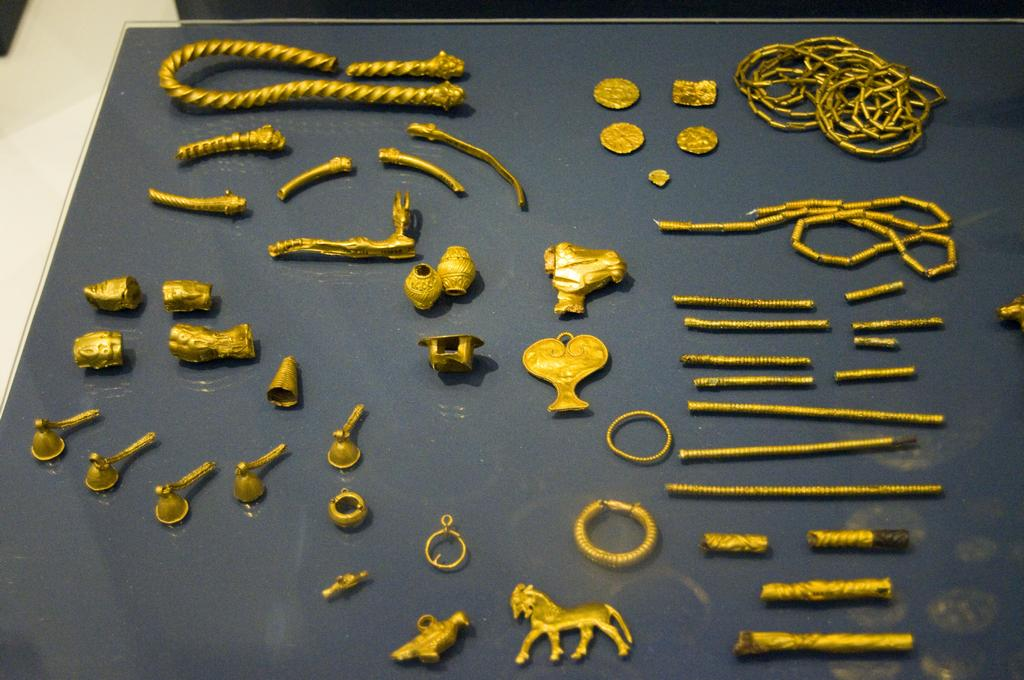
Assorted small objects from the Oxus treasure

The treasure was evidently discovered by local people somewhere on the north bank of the Oxus in what is today Tajikistan but was in the 1870s in the Emirate of Bokhara, which was in the process of being swallowed up by the Russian Empire. Then as now, the south bank of the Oxus was Afghanistan; at the period when the treasure originated the whole area was part of the Persian Empire. The approximate area of the discovery is fairly clear; it was near, perhaps some three miles south of, Takhti-Sangin, where an important temple was excavated by Soviet archaeologists in the 20th century, producing a large number of finds of metalwork and other objects, which seem to have been deposited from about 300 BC to as late as the third century AD. While it is tempting to connect the temple and treasure, as some scholars have proposed, the range of objects found, and a founding date for the temple proposed by the excavators of about 300 BC, do not neatly match up. The area was a major ancient crossing point for the Oxus, and the treasure may have come from further afield.

The first mention in print of the treasure was an article in a Russian newspaper in 1880, written by a Russian general who in 1879 was in the area enquiring into the Trans-Caspian railway that the Russians had just begun to construct. He recounted that local reports said that treasure had been found in the ruins of an ancient fort called "Takht-i Kuwad", which was sold to Indian merchants. A later report by Sir Alexander Cunningham, the British general and archaeologist who was the first Director of the Archaeological Survey of India, described the finds, which he said began in 1877, as being in the river itself, "scattered about in the sands of the river", in a place exposed in the dry season, though another account he later gave, based on new information, rather confused the issue. Cunningham acquired many pieces himself through dealers in northern India (modern Pakistan). Another account by a British general owning some objects said that they had been discovered in 1876, exposed by "a land slip of the river bank". Hopeful diggers continued to excavate the site for years afterwards, and perhaps objects continued to be found; accounts from locals mention many gold "idols", a gold tiger, and other objects not tallying with the surviving pieces.

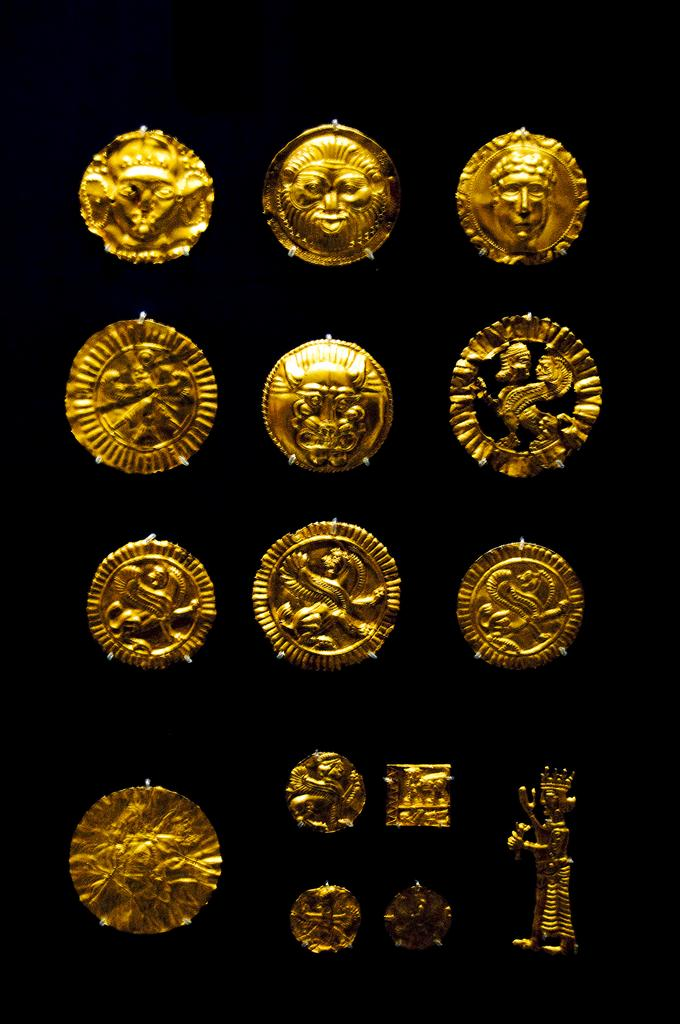
Gold plaques for attaching to clothing

One large group of objects, perhaps the bulk of the treasure, was bought from locals by three merchants from Bokhara in 1880, who unwisely left their convoy on the road south from Kabul to Peshawar and were captured by Afghan tribesmen, who carried them and their goods into the hills, but allowed a servant of the merchants to escape. News of the episode reached Captain Francis Charles Burton, a British political officer in Afghanistan, who immediately set out with two orderlies. About midnight he came upon the robbers, who had already begun to fight among themselves, presumably over the division of the loot, with four of them lying wounded on the ground. The treasure was spread out on the floor of the cave they were sheltered in. In a parlay Burton recovered a good part of the treasure, and later a further portion, which he restored to the merchants. In gratitude, they sold him the bracelet which he sold to the Victoria and Albert Museum (now on loan to the British Museum) for £1,000 in 1884. The merchants then continued to Rawalpindi in modern Pakistan to sell the rest of the Treasure; Cunningham acquired many of these pieces, and through dealers, Franks others. The robbers evidently considered the objects as bullion, and had cut up some larger ones, such as a gold scabbard now in the British Museum. Other pieces may have been cut up in antiquity (like hacksilver), or upon discovery at the site. Franks later bought Cunningham's collection, and bequeathed all his objects to the British Museum at his death in 1897.

The incomplete model chariot and a detached figure of a rider were presented to the Viceroy of India at the time, Robert Bulwer-Lytton, 1st Earl of Lytton (son of the bestselling novelist) by Sir Louis Cavagnari, the British representative in Kabul after the Second Anglo-Afghan War. Cavagnari, his mission and their guards were all massacred in Kabul on 3 September 1879. Lytton's rider was acquired by the British Museum in 1931, and the chariot group in 1953.

== Religious context ==
The Achaemenid kings, at least after Cyrus the Great and Cambyses, describe themselves in inscriptions as worshippers of Ahuramazda, but it is not clear if their religious practice included Zoroastrianism. It is also evident that it was not the Persian way to impose the royal religious beliefs on their subjects (as for example the Jews, whose religious practices were not interfered with after they were conquered). Other Persian cults were the worship of Mithra and of Zurvan, and other local cults seem to have continued under the empire. The religious context of the treasure is unclear, although it is thought to have come from a temple.

== Authenticity ==
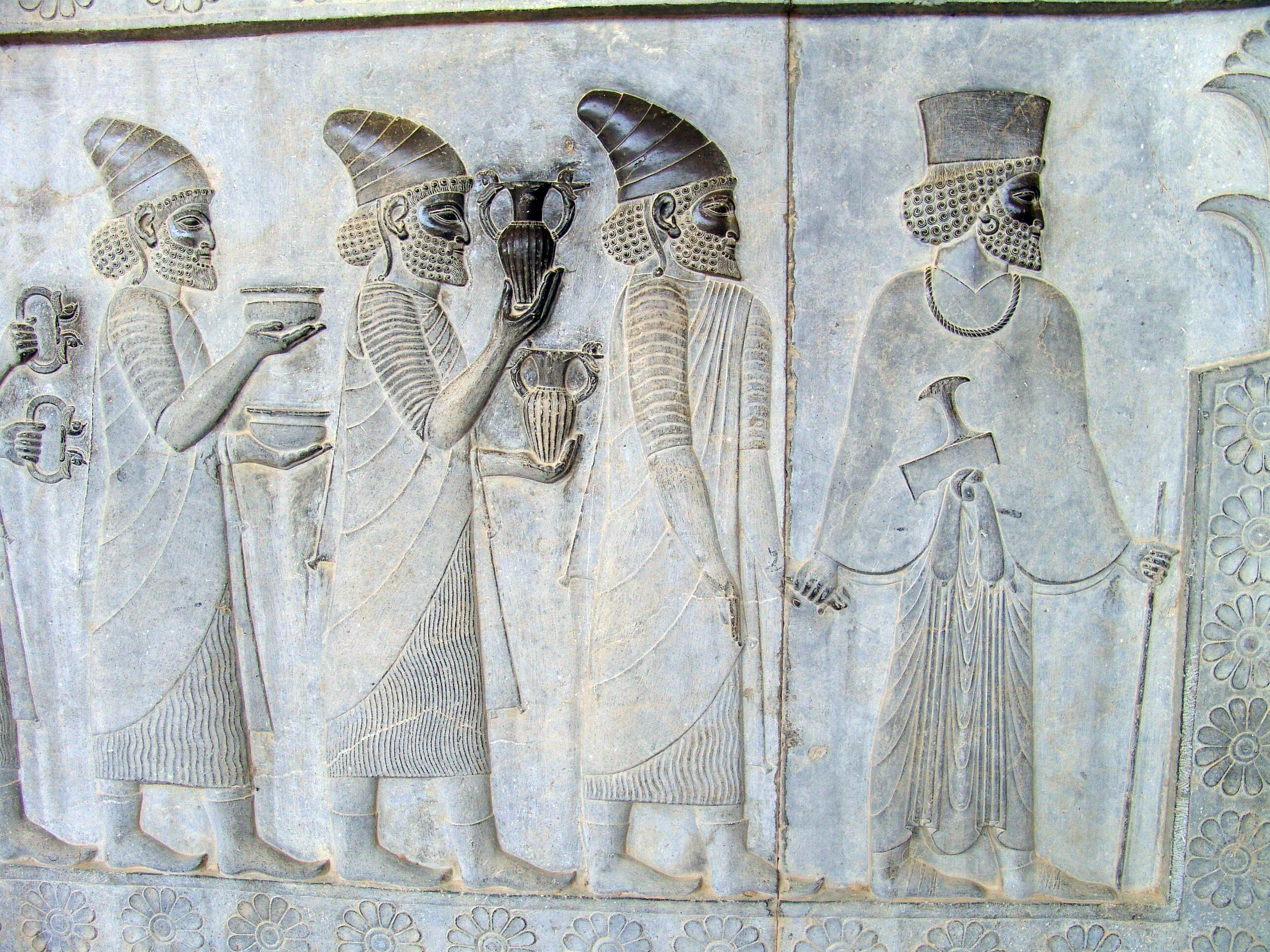
Comparable objects in the "Apadama" reliefs at Persepolis: armlets, bowls, and amphorae with griffin handles are given as tribute

The circumstances of the discovery and trading of the pieces, and their variety of styles and quality of workmanship, cast some doubt on their authenticity from the start, and "necessitate a cautious treatment of the Oxus Treasure, for it has passed through places of evil repute and cannot have come out quite unscathed", as Dalton put it in 1905. Indeed, Dalton records that Indian dealers initially made copies of items and tried to pass them off to Franks, who though not deceived, bought some "at a small percentage over the gold value" and then received the genuine objects, which were easily distinguished. Considerable comfort has been received from the objects' similarity to later Achaemenid finds, many excavated under proper archaeological conditions, which the Oxus Treasure certainly was not. In particular, finds of jewellery including armlets and torcs in a tomb at Susa by a French expedition from 1902 onwards (now in the Louvre) are closely similar to the Oxus finds.

As the quality and style of the objects was generally considered to have stood the test of time, concerns over the antiquity of the great majority of the objects reduced over the years. The issue was revived in 2003 when the archaeologist Oscar Muscarella, employed by the Metropolitan Museum of Art in New York for 40 years, was reported in The Times, in a story by Peter Watson, to have "labelled as mostly fake" the treasure. However he was attacked by the Director of the Metropolitan, Philippe de Montebello, who said Muscarella, a long-standing critic of museums' tolerance and even encouragement of the trade in illegal antiquities, only remained there because of the "exigencies of academic tenure", and was himself criticised for suppressing debate. In an article on the Oxus Treasure published in 2003 Muscarella goes nothing like as far, but does fiercely attack the assumed unity of the treasure and the narratives of its provenience, and is sceptical of the authenticity of some of the votive plaques (especially the largest in the illustration above). In a follow-up article, John Curtis has argued there is overwhelming contemporary evidence that the Treasure was discovered on the north bank of the River Oxus between 1877 and 1880, and he also maintains that most if not all of the objects in the Treasure are genuine.

== Tajik government ==
In 2007, Emomalii Rahmon, President of Tajikistan, was reported as calling for the repatriation of the treasure, despite the fact that it had been recovered and sold by local peoples and acquired by museums in the art market. However, no formal claim has been made by the Tajik government, and in 2013, "high-quality golden replicas" of pieces from the Oxus Treasure were presented to the Tajik government by the British Museum, intended for the new Tajik National Museum.
