= Takht-i Sangin =

Greco-Bactrian archaeological site

Coordinates: 37°5′56″N 68°17′6″E

Takht-i Sangin

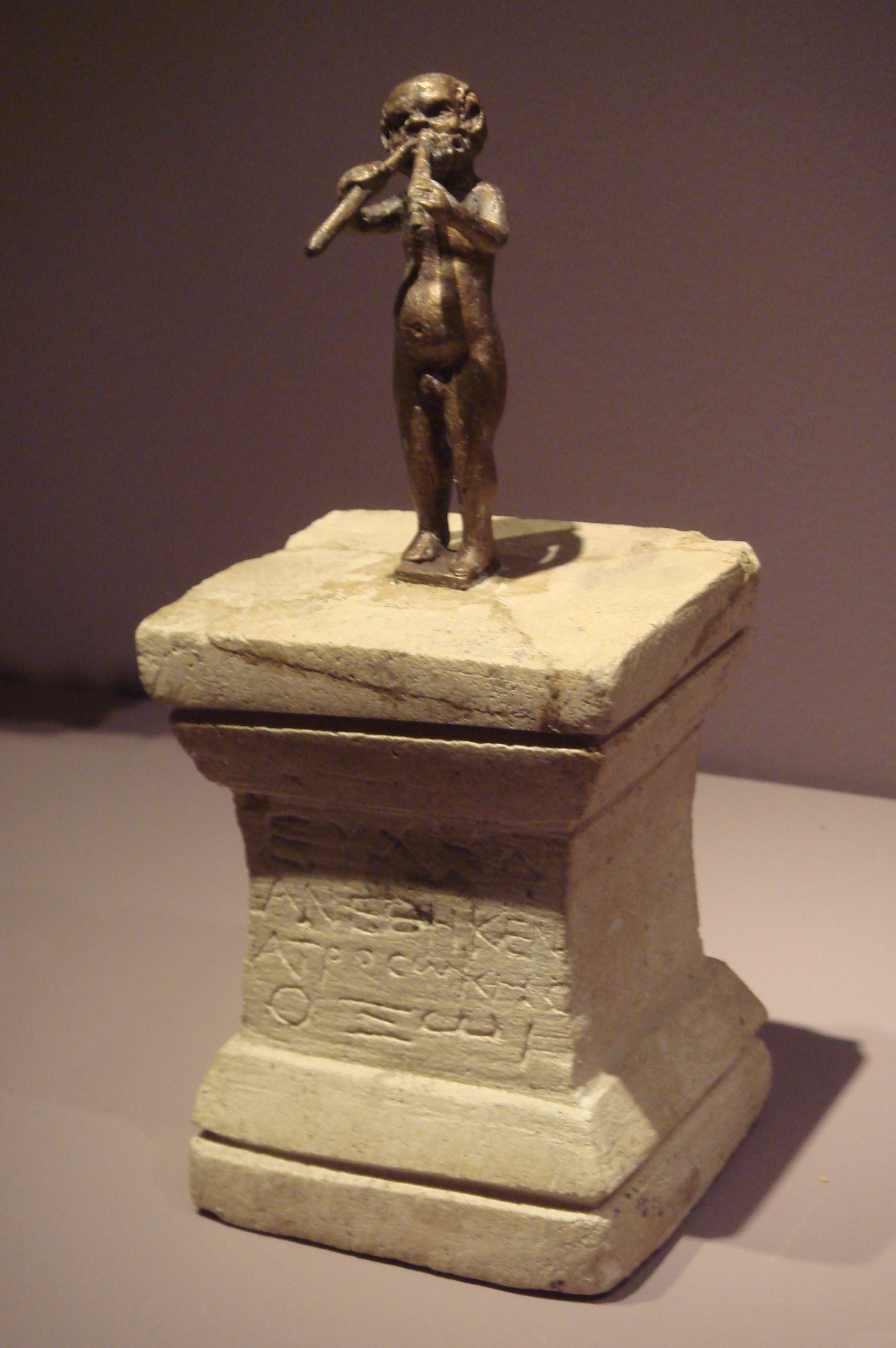
Hellenistic silenus Marsyas from Takhti Sangin, with dedication in Greek to the god Oxus, by "Atrosokes", a Bactrian name. Temple of the Oxus, Takht-i Sangin, 200-150 BC. National Museum of Antiquities of Tajikistan.

Location of Takht-i Sangin in Central Asia.
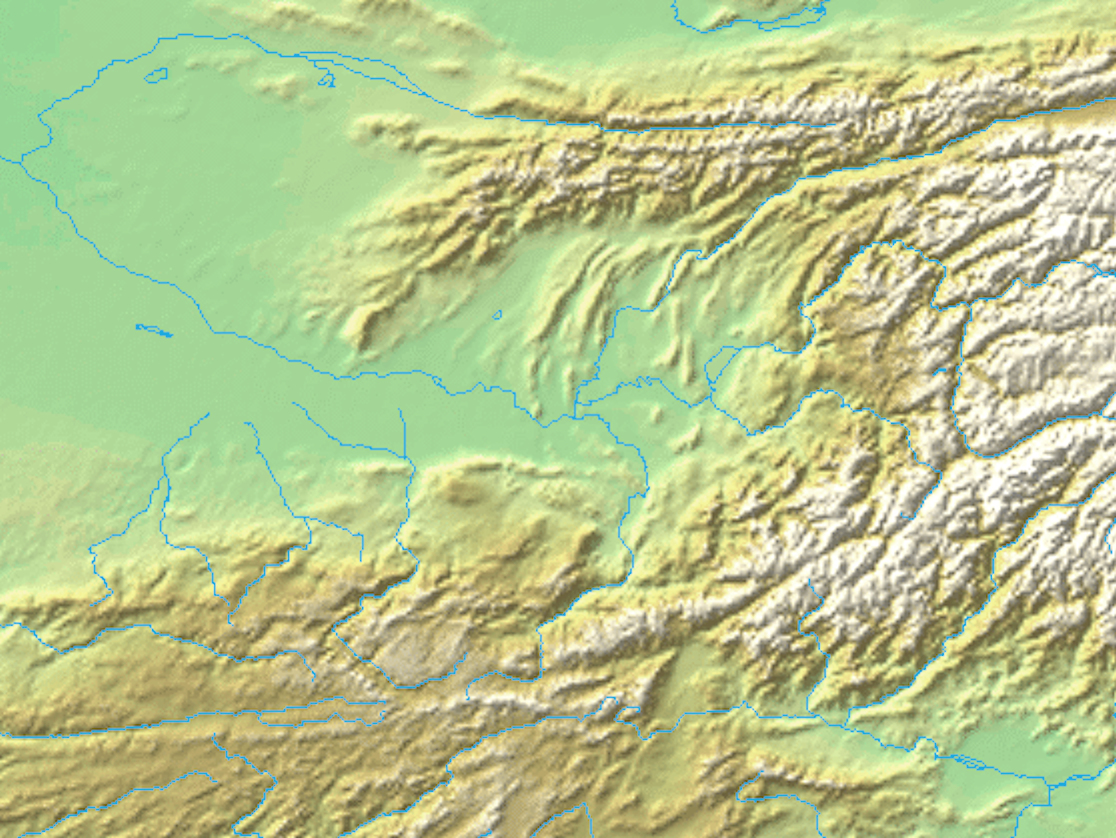
Takht-i Sangin (Bactria)
Takht-i Sangin (Tajikistan)

Takht-i Sangin (Tajik: Тахти Сангин, lit. 'Throne of Stone'") is an archaeological site located near the confluence of the Vakhsh and Panj rivers, the source of the Amu Darya, in southern Tajikistan. During the Hellenistic period it was a city in the Greco-Bactrian kingdom with a large temple dedicated to the Oxus (Vakhsh river), which remained in use in the following Kushan period, until the third century AD. The site may have been the source of the Oxus Treasure.

== Description ==
Takht-i Sangin is located on a raised flat area sandwiched between the west bank of the Amu Darya river and the base of the Teshik Tosh mountain to the west. This terrace is about three kilometres long from north to south and varies from 100 to 450 metres in width. The site is immediately south of the point where the Vakhsh / Amu Darya river (the ancient Oxus) is met by the Panj river (the ancient Ochus), about five kilometres north of Takht-i Kuvad, where the Oxus Treasure was discovered. Another significant Greco-Bactrian site, Ai Khanoum, is also located on the Panj river, a little over a hundred kilometres to the east. Pottery finds indicate that the whole terrace of Takht-i Sangin was populated in the third and second centuries BC. The river and the mountain provided natural defences on the eastern and western sides of the settlement, but city walls bounded the city at the north and south ends. Further east-west walls divided the site into a number of sections. The site could not have been supported from the very limited arable land in the area immediately surrounding it. The site's political and/or religious significance must have enabled it to draw on resources from further afield. Lindström proposes that the settlement and its temple functioned as the central religious site for the worship of Oxus for the whole of Bactria. In the 130s BC, the site was sacked, probably by the Kushans and under their rule most of the site was abandoned.

=== Temple of Oxus ===
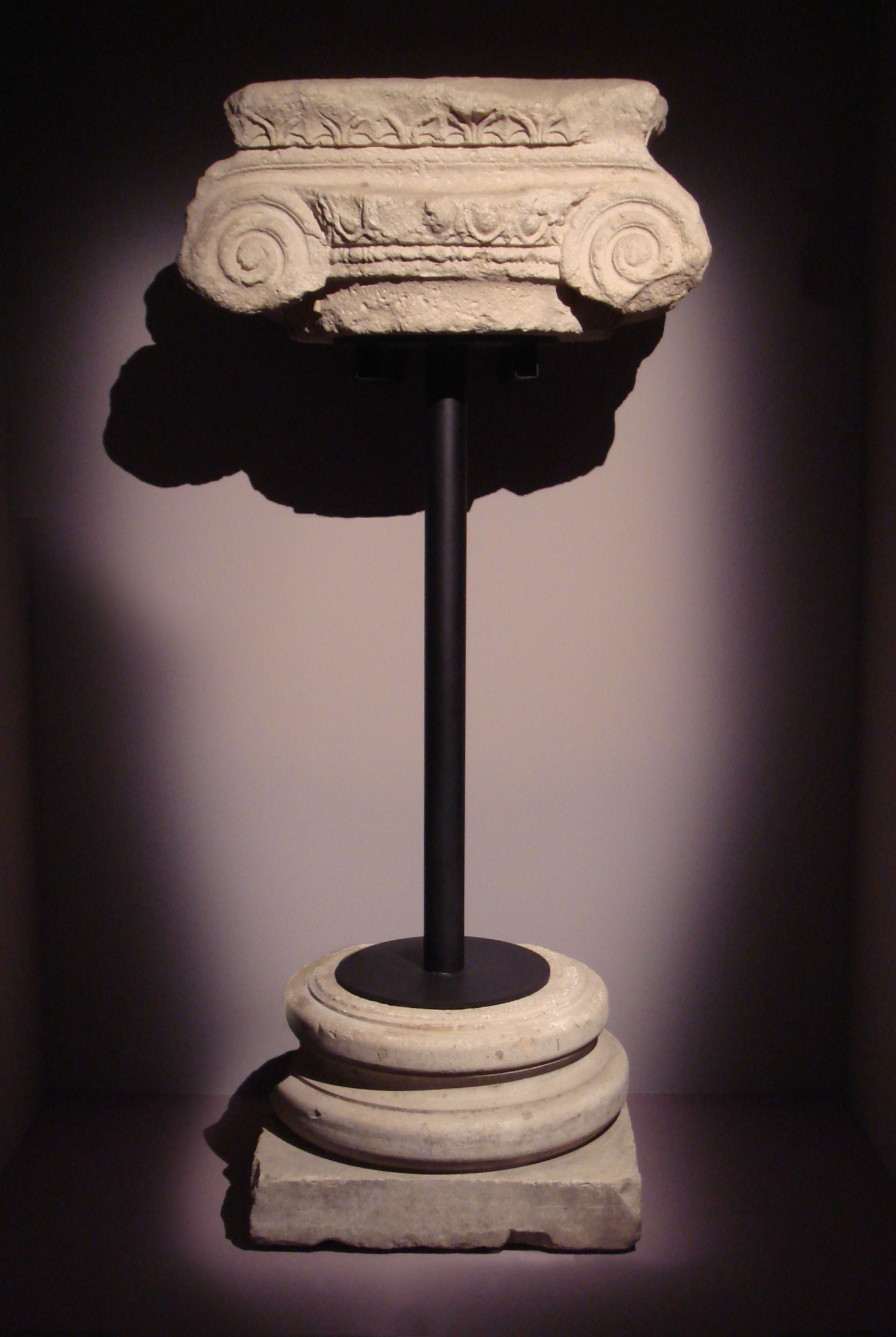
Ionic pillar, cella of the Temple of the Oxus, Takht-i Sangin, late 4th - early 3rd century BC.

In the middle of the terrace, there was a citadel, measuring around 170–210 metres by 240 metres, on top of a ten-metre-high artificial mound. This mount was surrounded by a ditch and a two-metre-high stone wall on the northern, western, and southern sides. On the eastern side it bordered the river, and there are traces of a dock, which is now inaccessible.

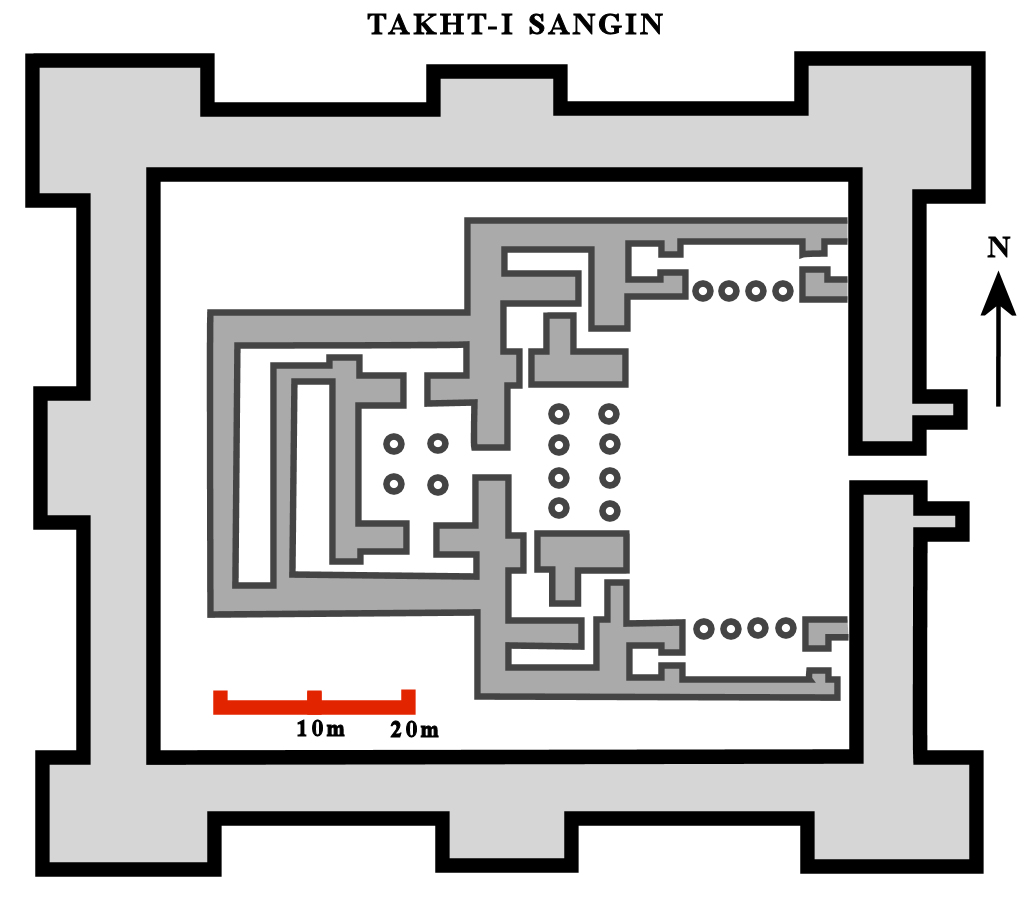
Takht-i Sangin, plan of the Temple, with surrounding walls.

The centre of the citadel contained the Oxus Temple, which was first built around 300 BC. The size of the temple suggests that its construction was financed by an external authority, probably the Seleucids. The temple is surrounded by a massive mud-brick wall with tower-like projections at the corners and in the centre of each side. The wall is 6 metres thick, 85 metres wide in a north-south direction and 100 metres long in an east-west direction. A propylon (gateway) in the east side of this wall leads to a large courtyard containing dedications and altars, measuring 44 metres north-south by ca. 20 metres east-west. This temple building is oriented to the compass directions, with its entrance facing east, towards the river. It is made of mud-brick with a flat roof and measures 44 metres wide and 50 metres long. The facade of the temple building stretches along the whole western side of the courtyard. At the centre of the facade is an aiwān (a pillared vestibule), with two rows of four columns. This is flanked on the left and right by wings, each with three rooms and a small tower. Behind the aiwān is a square central hall measuring about 11.5 x 12.7 metres, with four columns supporting the roof. There are blocks of stone at the back of the hall, probably the base of a cult image. Doors on the south and north sides of this hall leading to two corridors, which each wrap around the central hall in an L-shape.

The excavators, Igor Pichikyan and Boris Litvinsky, argued that the temple was the earliest known Zoroastrian fire temple, because they found remains of ashes in the rooms in the wings flanking the aiwān and pits filled with pure ashes in the central hall. Lindström disputes this interpretation, since the pits in the central hall are located under the columns and seem to be foundation deposits, because there is no evidence for a fire-altar in the central hall, and because there is a Greek-style sacrificial altar in the courtyard.

=== Votive finds ===
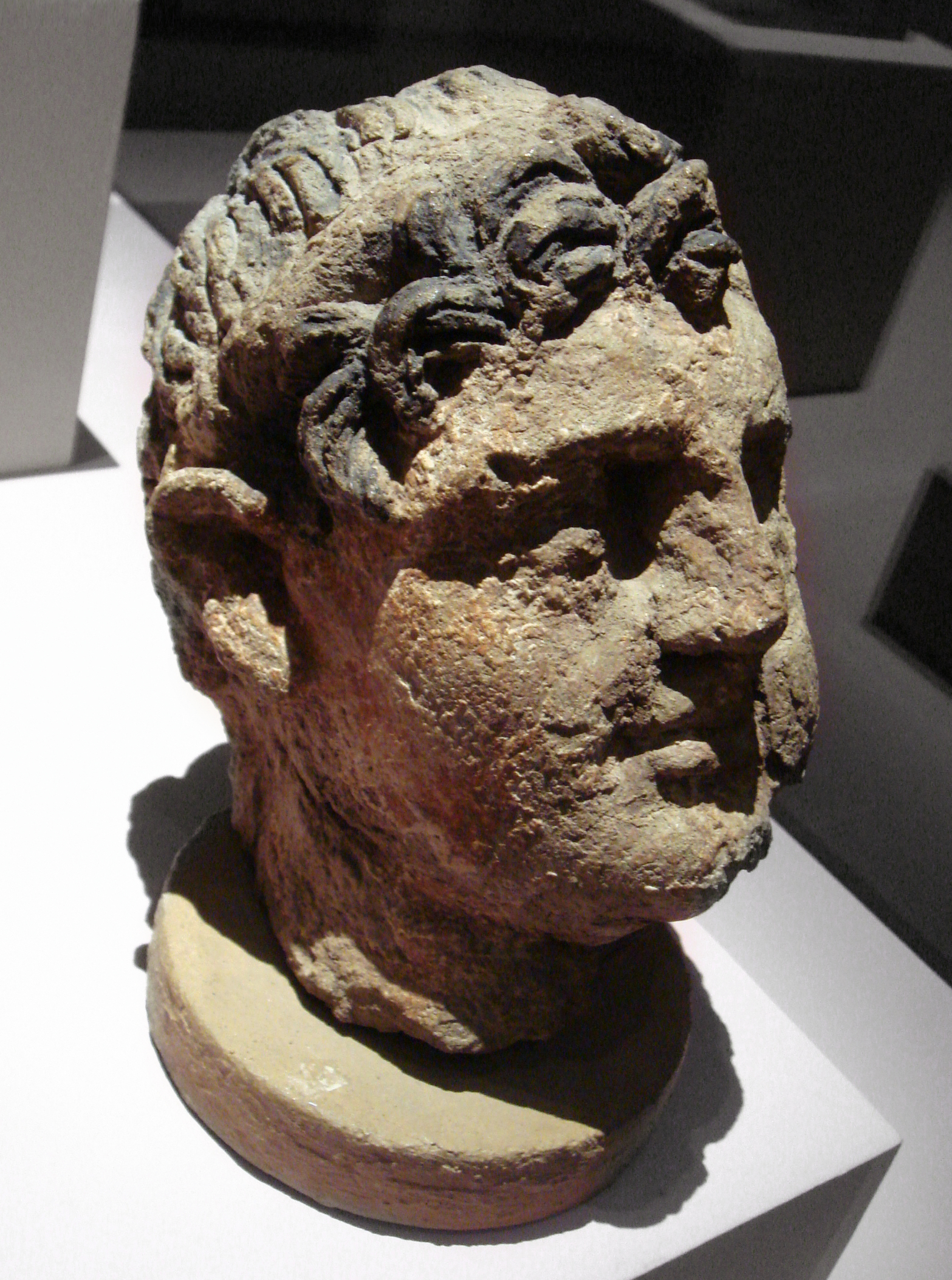
Head of a Greco-Bactrian ruler with diadem, Temple of the Oxus, Takht-i-Sangin, 3rd-2nd century BC. This could also be a portrait of Seleucus I.

Somewhere between 5,000 and 8,000 other votive offerings in gold, silver, bronze, iron, lead, glass, plaster, terracotta, precious stones, limestone, shell, bone, ivory, and wood have been found. Most of these were located in the central hall of the temple and the corridors behind it, both above ground and in buried caches. These votives include portraits of Greco-Bactrian kings, jewellery, and furniture, but especially weapons and armour. Many of these votives were probably buried when the community was sacked by the Kushans in the 130s BC. After the sack, the rest of the site was abandoned, but the temple remained in use until the third century AD, with the Kushans continuing to dedicate weapons, especially arrowheads, in very large numbers.

In the courtyard, excavators recovered a small stone base surmounted by a little bronze statuette of a Silenus, perhaps Marsyas, playing the aulos, with a Greek inscription reading "[in fulfilment of] a vow, Atrosokes dedicated [this] to Oxus." This is the basis for the identification of the whole sanctuary as a temple of Oxus. Lindström calls the combination of Greek mythological figure, a man with an Iranian name, and a local Bactrian deity "a mixture of influences that is characteristic of ... the Hellenistic Far East."

Takht-i Sangin is a suspected original location for the Oxus Treasure that now resides in the Victoria and Albert Museum and British Museum.

== Research history ==
Brief investigations of Takht-i Sangin were undertaken in 1928, 1950, and 1956. Igor Pichikyan and Boris Litvinsky began major excavations of the temple and surrounding site in 1976, under the aegis of the South Tajik Archaeological Expedition, a branch of the Institute of History, Archaeology, and Ethnography in the Academy of Sciences of the Tajik Soviet Socialist Republic. These excavations continued until the collapse of the Soviet Union in 1991, at which point the site was completely recovered for its protection. The final reports on these excavations were published in Russian in three volumes between 2000 and 2010. The Tajikistani Civil War prevented any excavation work until 1998, when Anjelina Drujinina began new excavations under the Tajik Academy of Sciences, in collaboration with the Maecenas Foundation and then the Miho Museum. These excavations came to an end in 2010 and preliminary reports have been published in the Bulletin of the Miho Museum. A French-Tajik team led by Mathilde Gelde of the French National Centre for Scientific Research have been attempting to carry out further excavations since 2013, but owing to security concerns arising from the conflict in Afghanistan excavations have only taken place once, in 2014. Most of the finds from the temple and the surrounding site are now kept in the National Museum of Antiquities of Tajikistan and the National Museum of Tajikistan in Dushanbe.

This site was added to the UNESCO World Heritage Tentative List on November 9, 1999 in the Cultural category.

== Artifacts ==
=== Achaemenid period (6th-4th century BC) ===
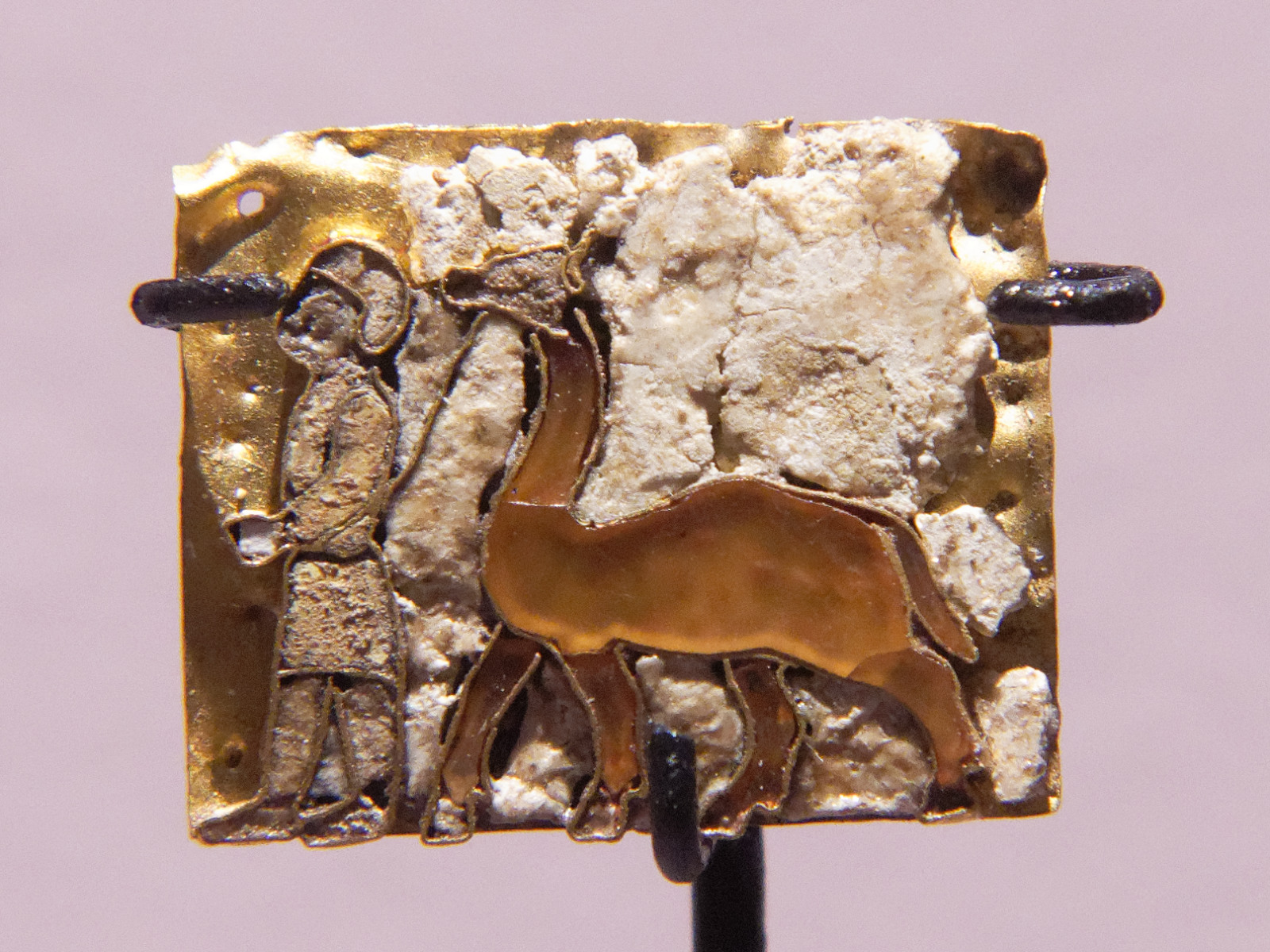
Votive plaque in cloisonné with man leading a camel, Temple of the Oxus, Takht-i Sangin, 6th-5th century BC

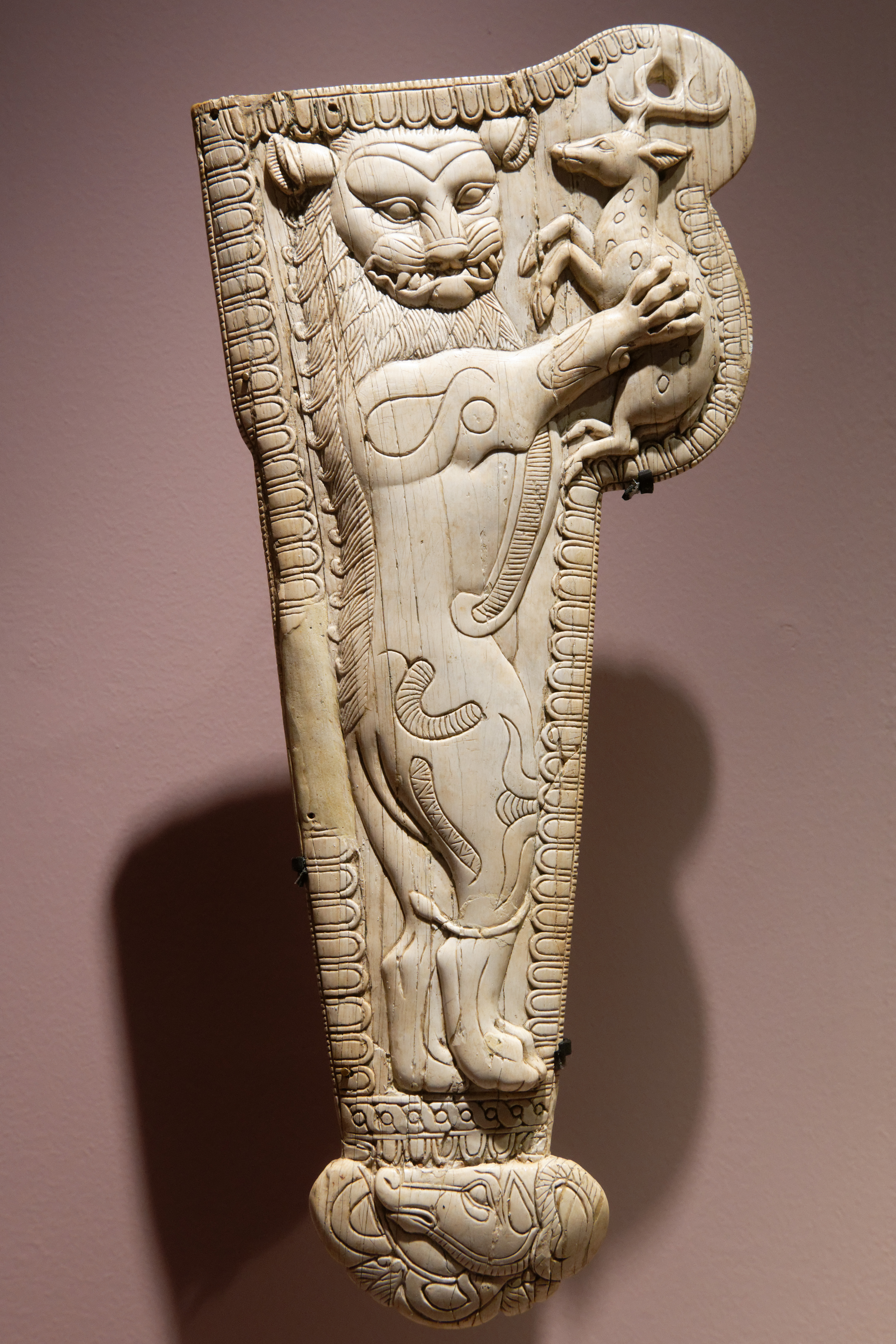
Akinakes holder, ivory, Takht-i Sangin, Temple of the Oxus, Tajikistan, 5th-4th century BC.

=== Seleucid and Greco-Bactrian periods (4th-2nd century BC) ===
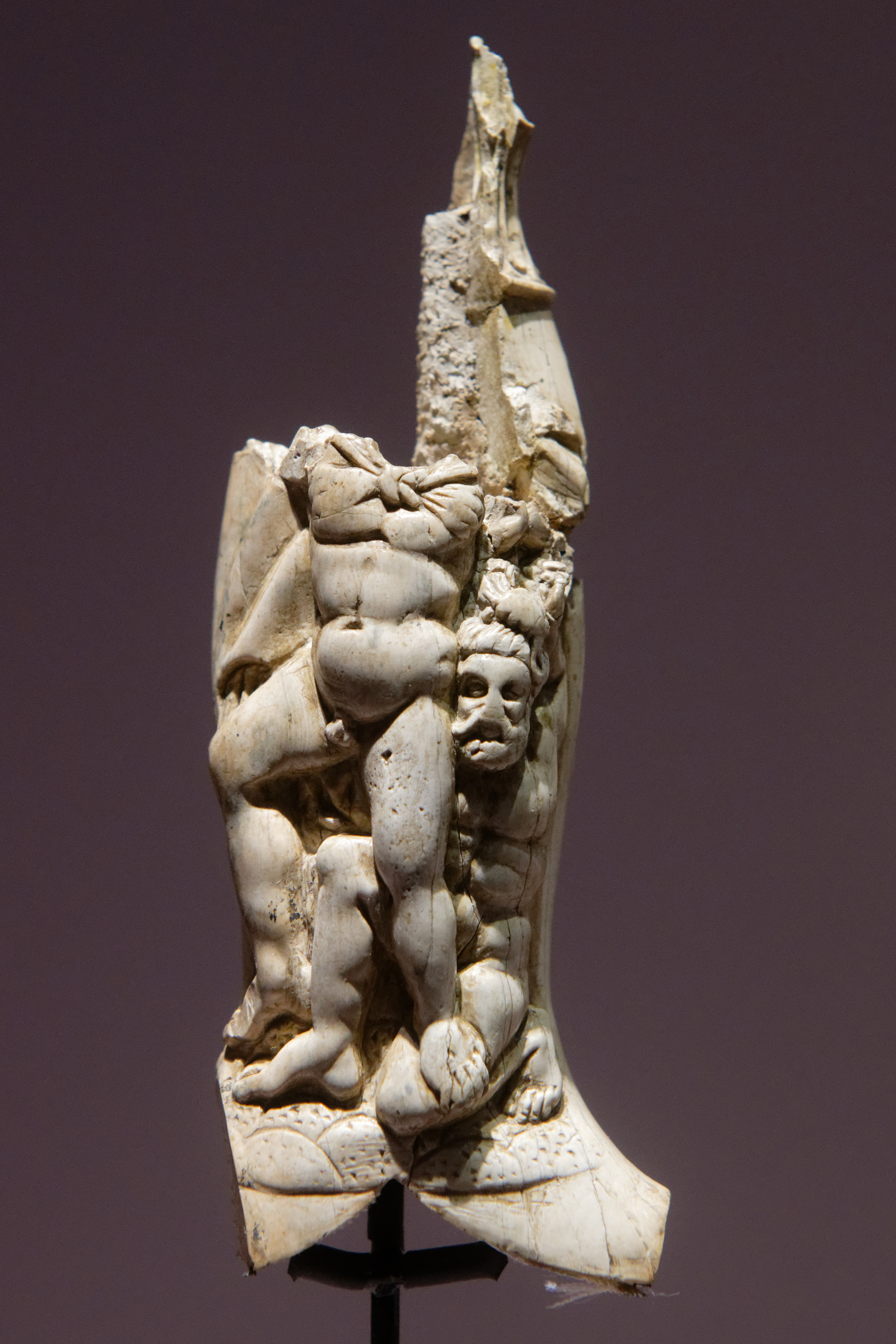
Herakles vanquishing Acheloos, Temple of the Oxus, Takht-i-Sangin, 4th century BC.

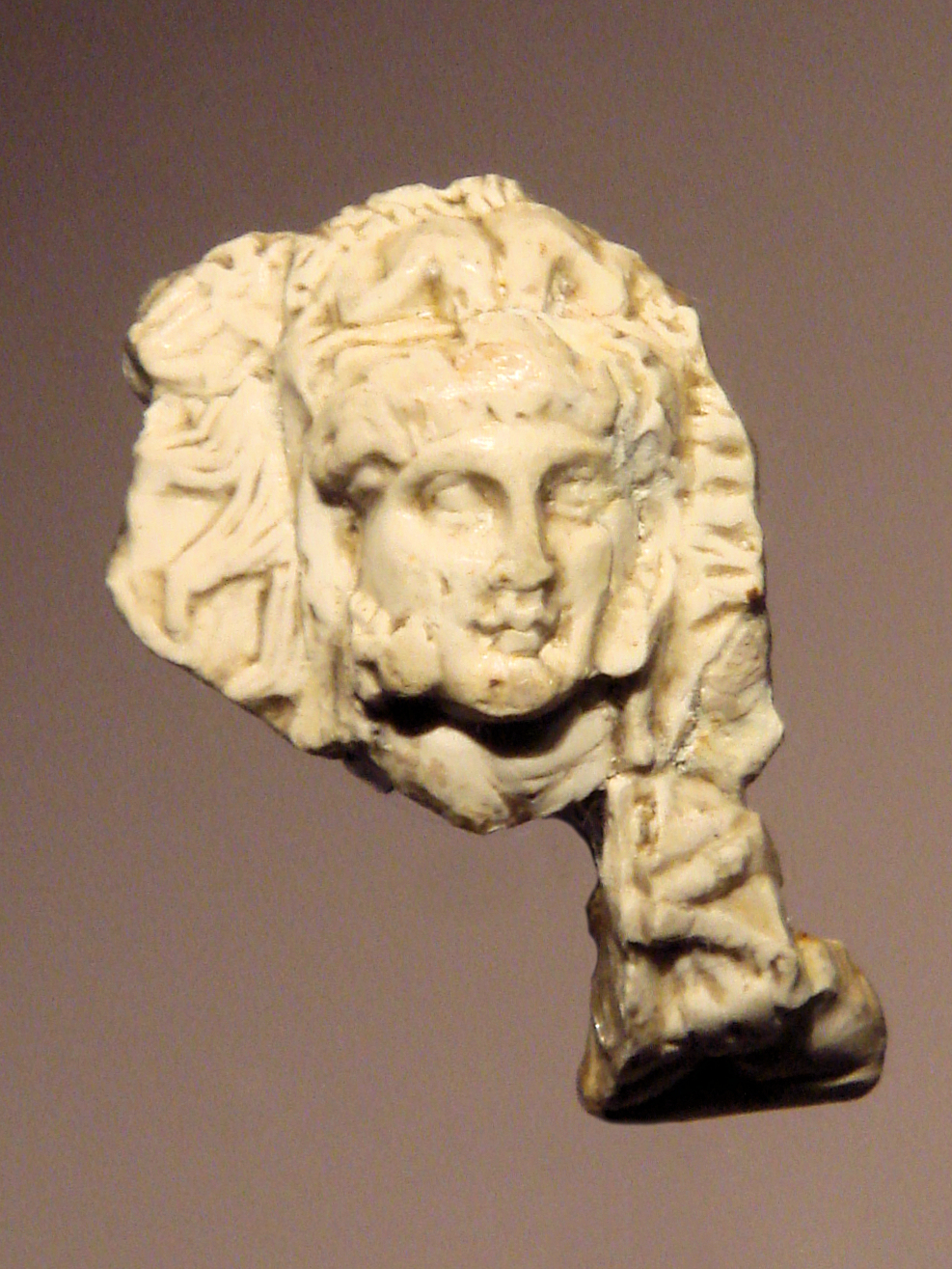
Alexander-Herakles head, Takht-i Sangin, Temple of the Oxus, 3rd century BCE.

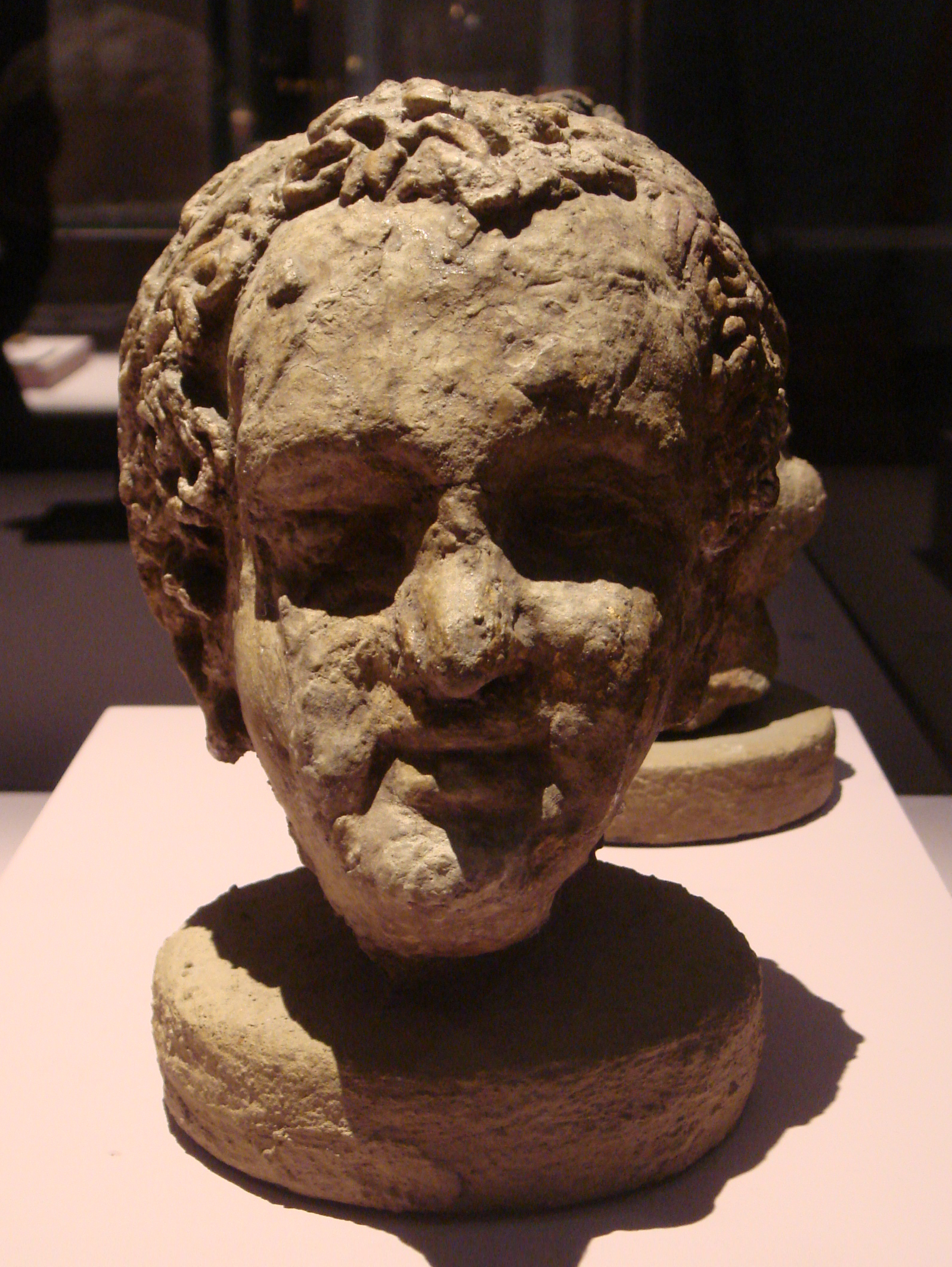
Head of a Seleucid or Greco-Bactrian ruler wearing a diadem, Temple of the Oxus, Takht-i-Sangin, 3rd-2nd century BC.

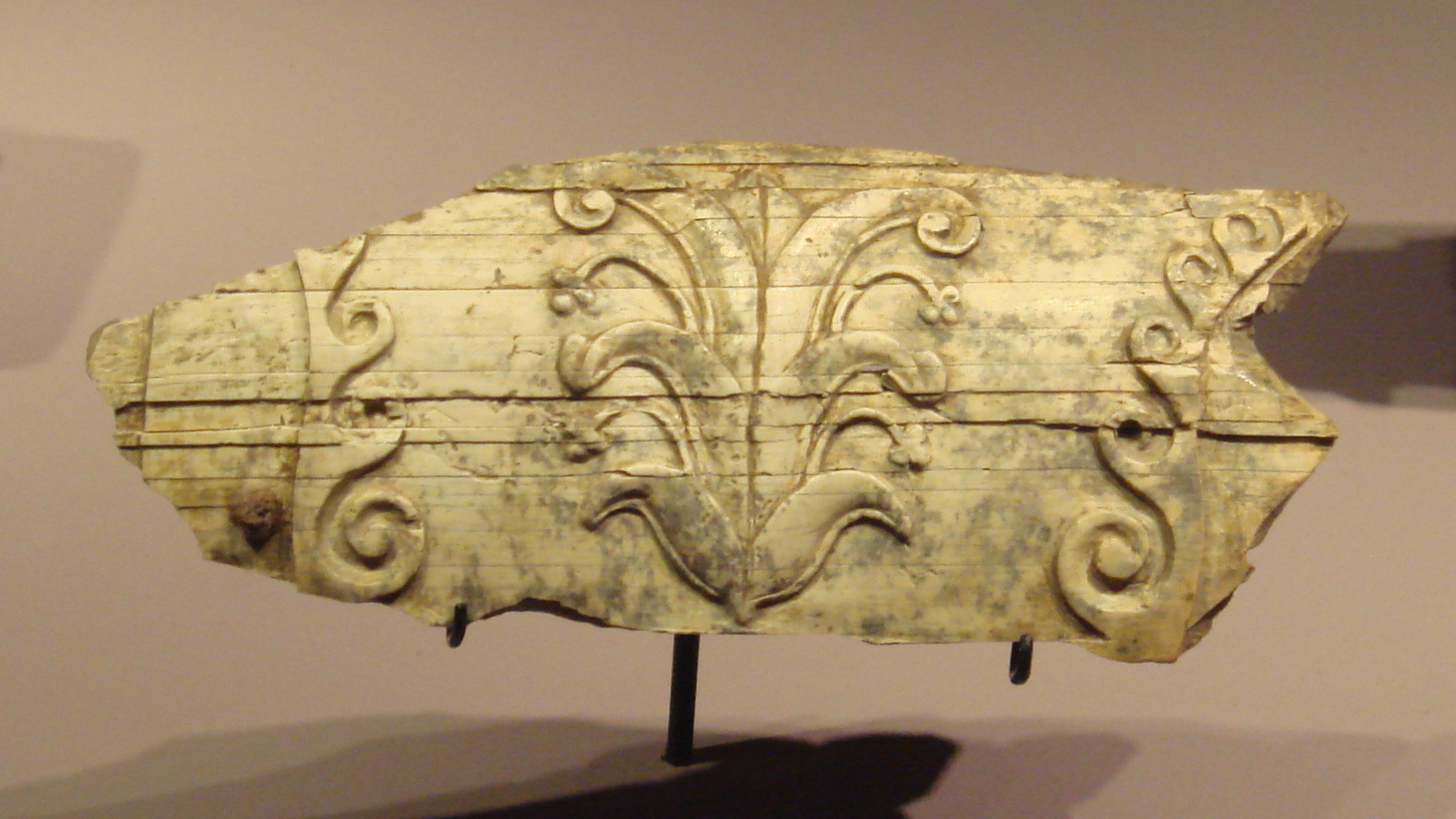
Palmette design, Temple of the Oxus, Takht-i Sangin, 3rd-2nd century BC

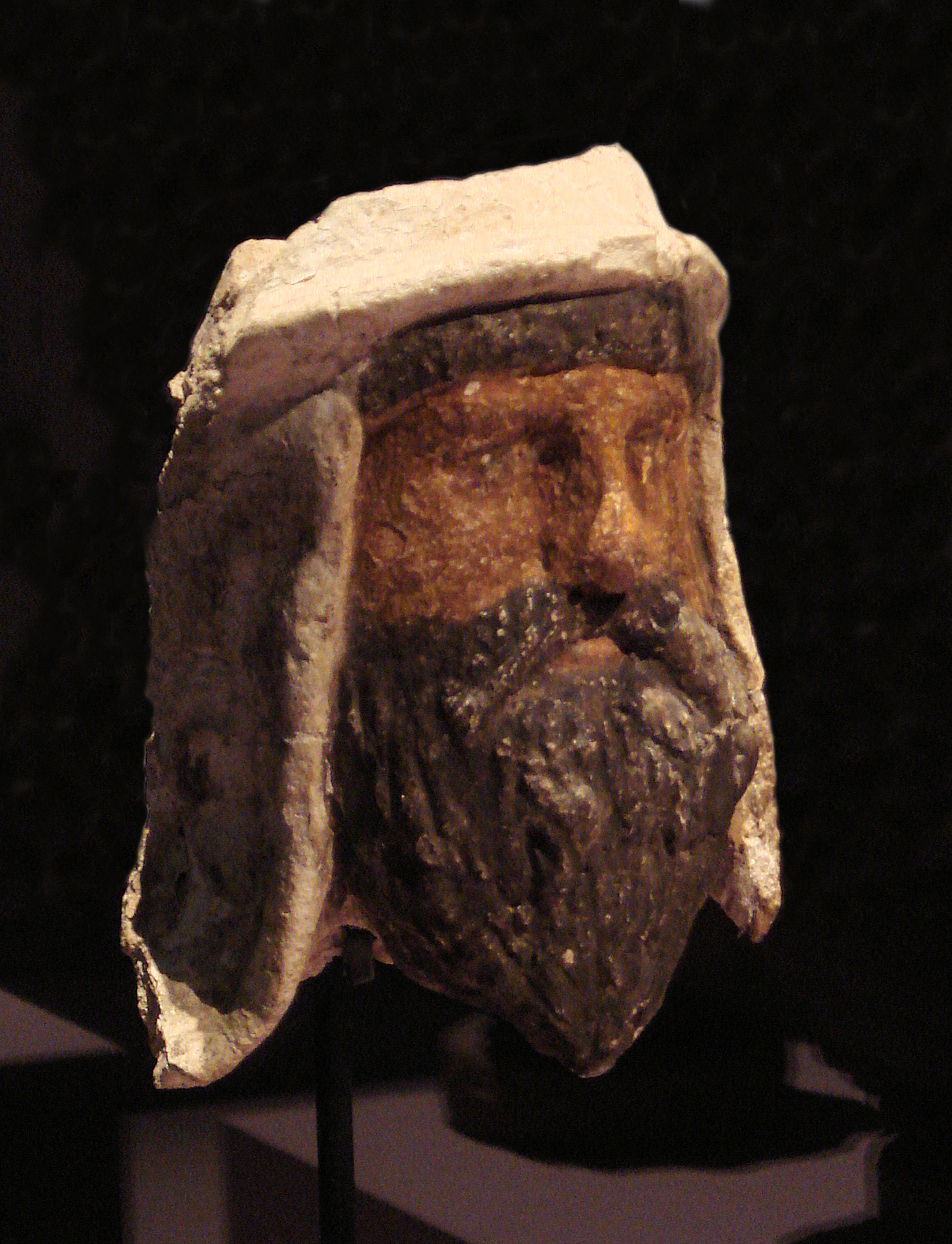
Painted clay and alabaster head, Takht-i Sangin, Tajikistan, 3rd-2nd century BCE. Possibly a Zoroastrian priest or a Bactrian ruler (Satrap), Temple of the Oxus, Takht-i-Sangin, 3rd-2nd century BCE.

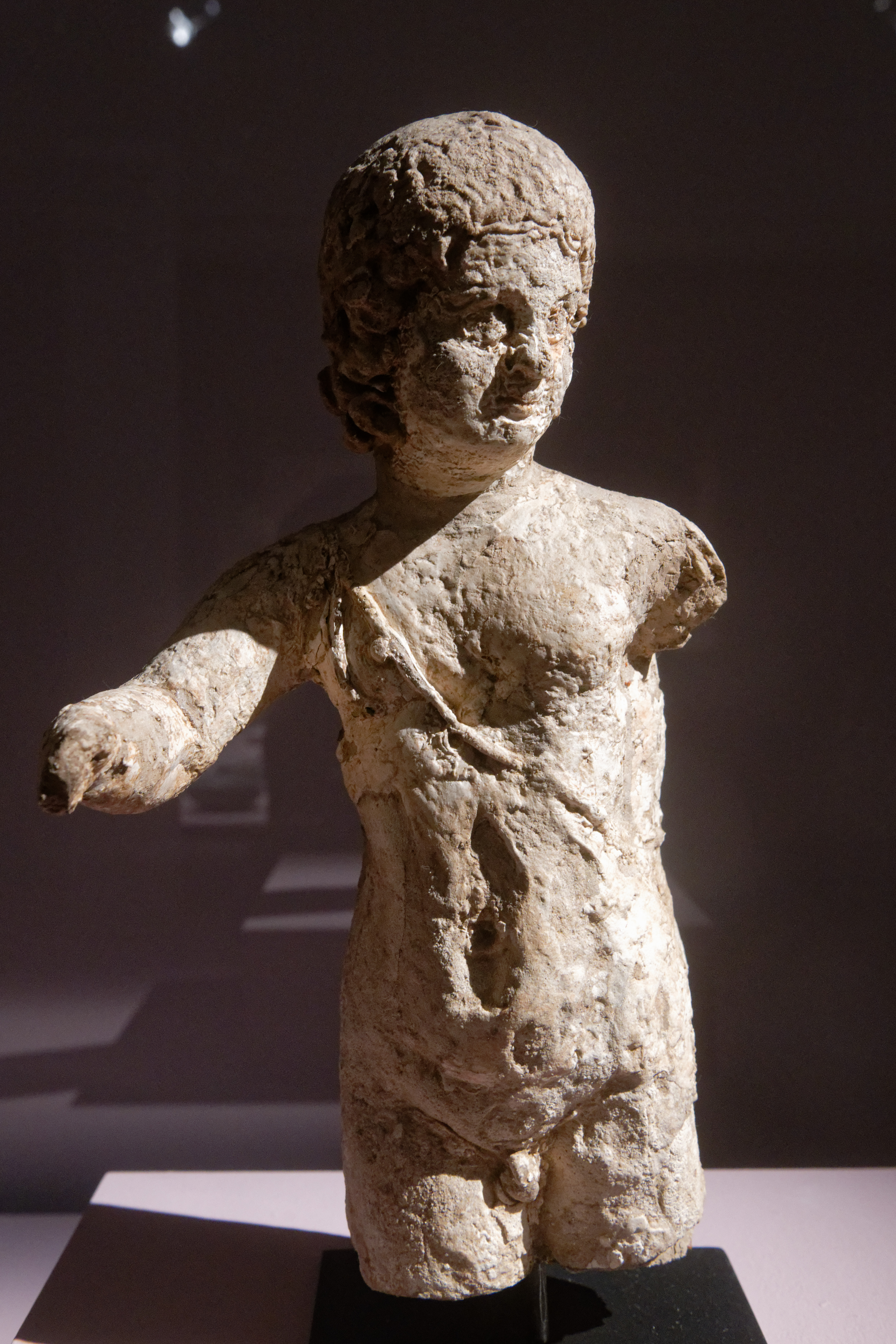
Young man (Apollo or Eros type), Temple of the Oxus, Takht-i Sangin, 3rd-2nd century BC

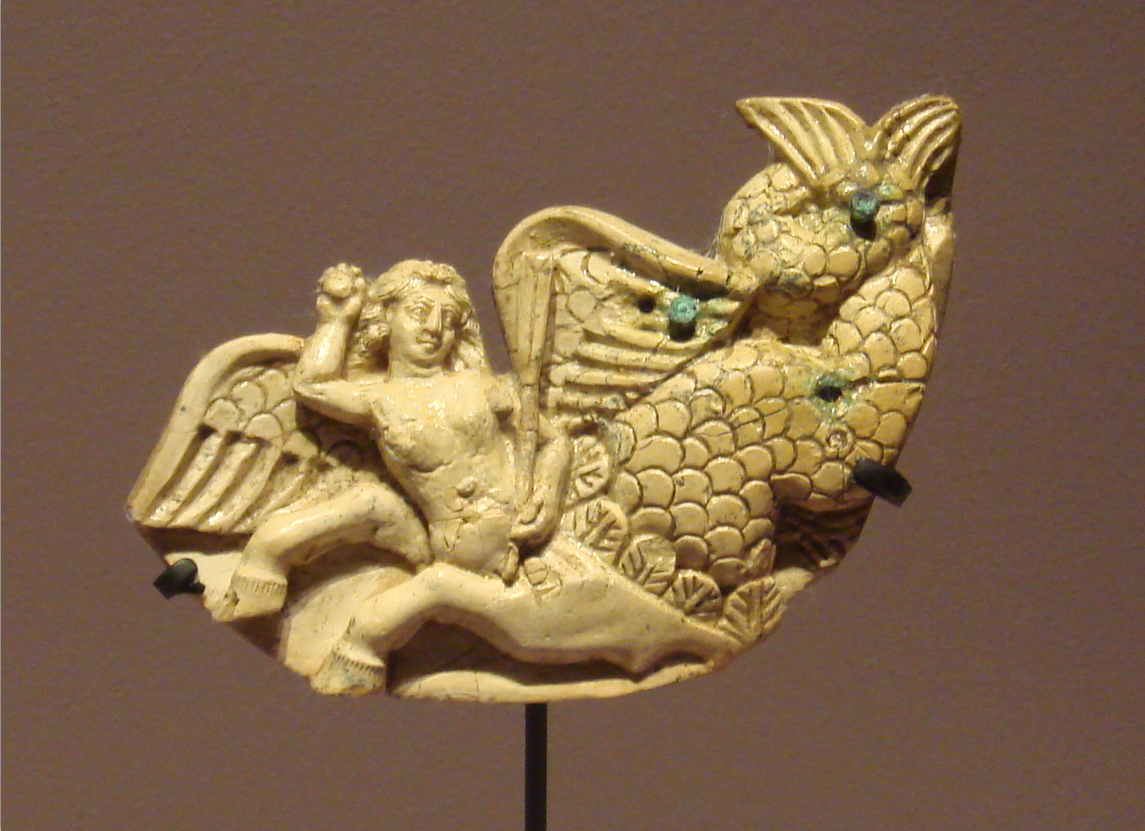
Aquatic divinity, Temple of the Oxus, Takht-i-Sangin, first half of 2nd century BC.

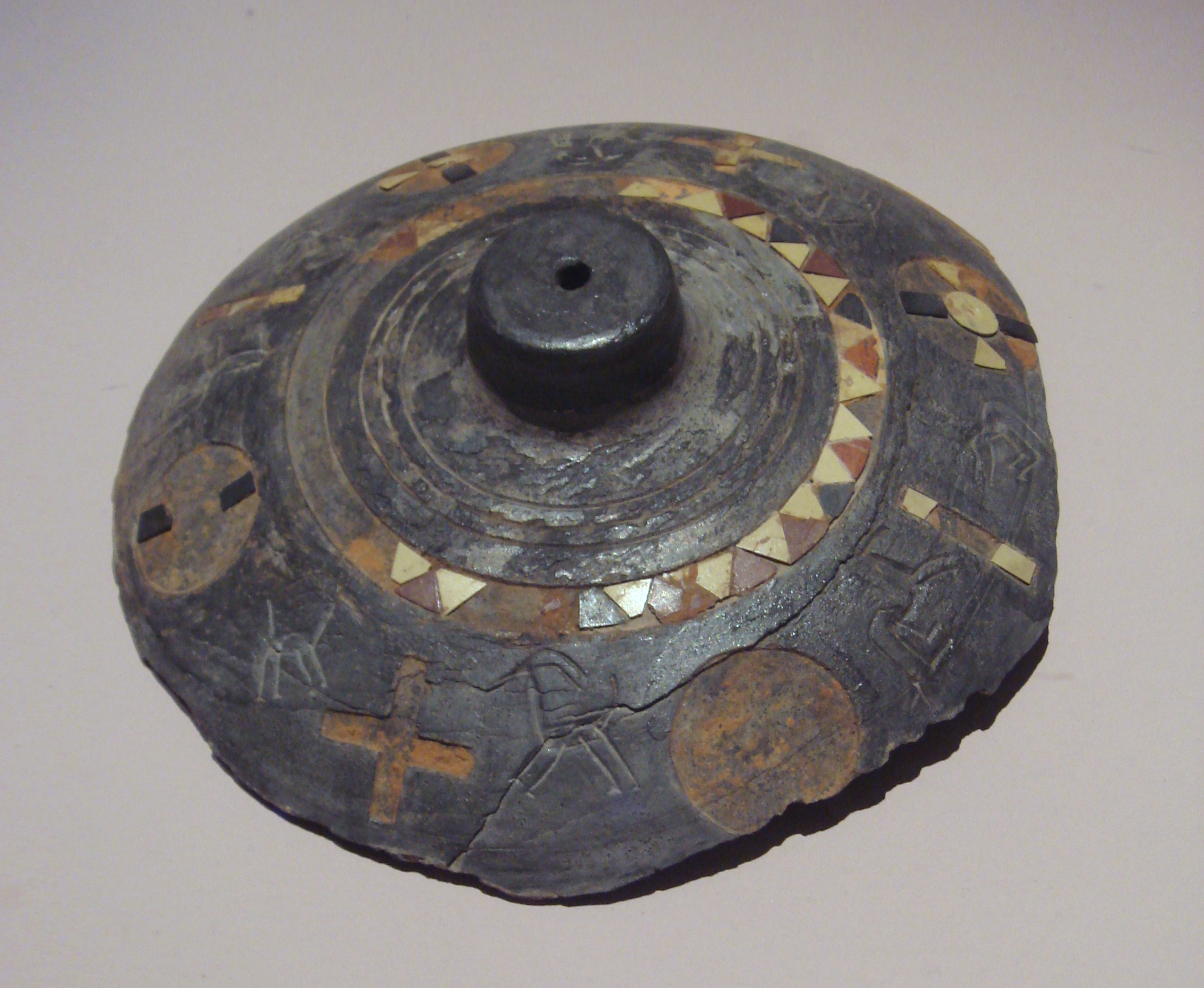
Decorated lid of a large pyxis, similar to those found in Ai-Khanoum, Takht-i Sangin, 3rd-2nd century BC, National Museum of Antiquities of Tajikistan (M 7126)

=== Saka (Scythian) period (2nd century BC - 2nd century AD) ===
Various artefacts are also dated the Saka (Scythian) period.

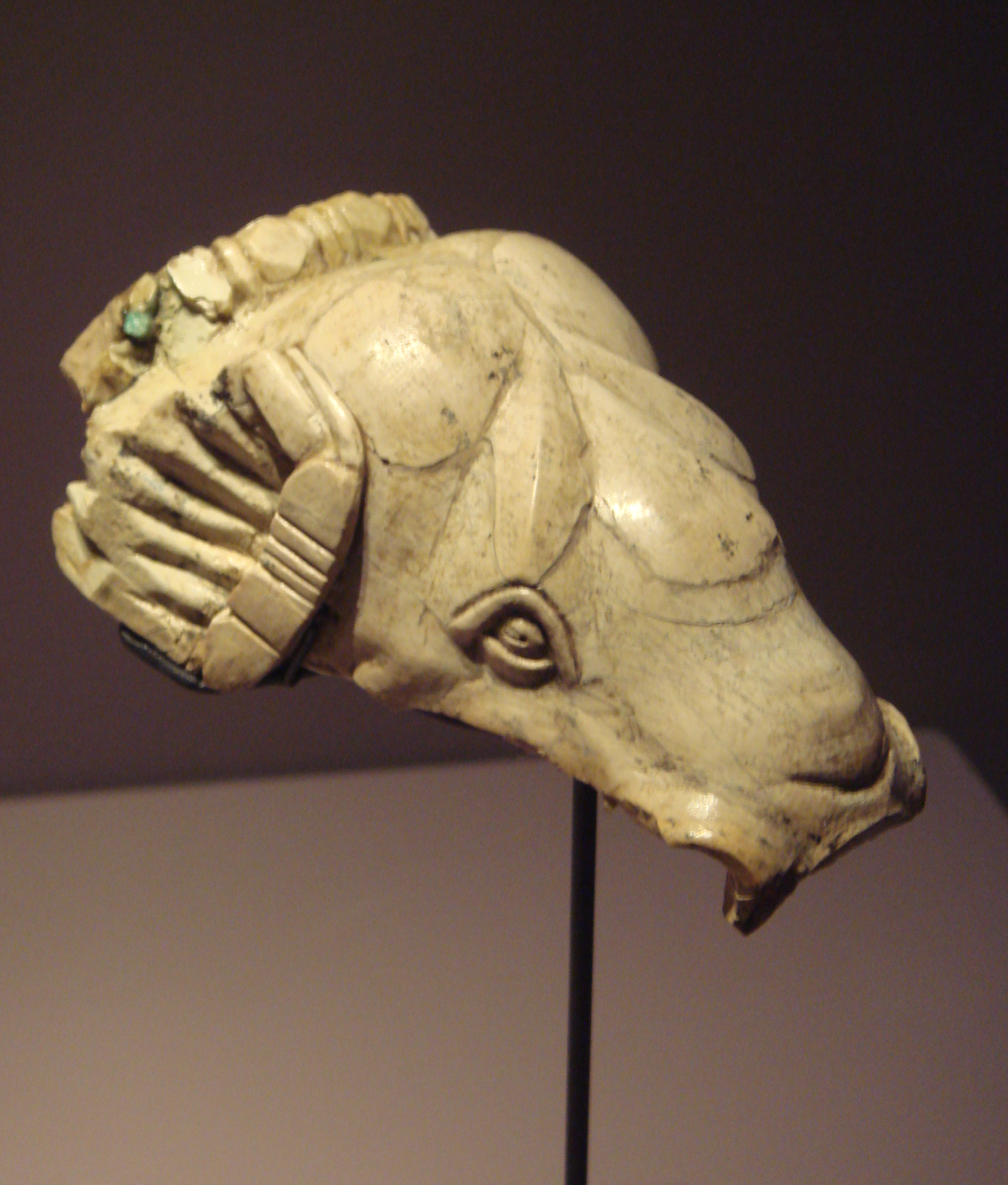
Fragment of the head of an elephant, ivory, Temple of the Oxus, Takht-i Sangin, 2nd-1st century BC

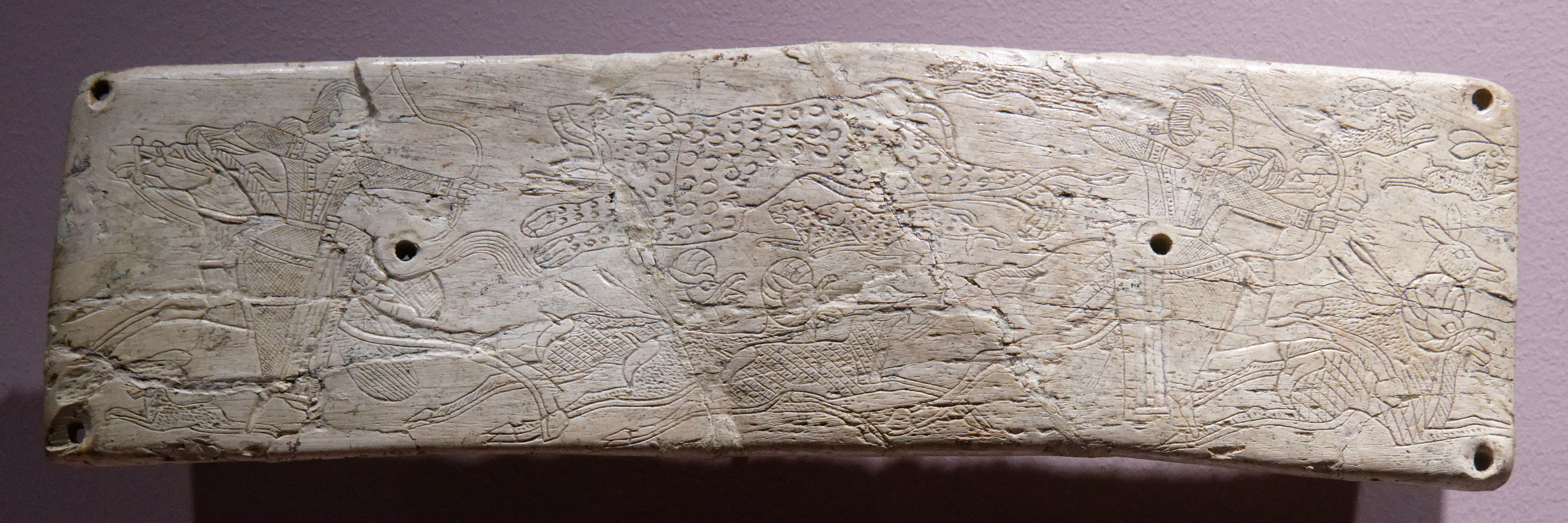
Hunters ivory plaque, Takht-i Sangin, Temple of the Oxus, 1st century BC- 1st century AD. The design is comparable to the hunting scenes of the Orlat plaques.

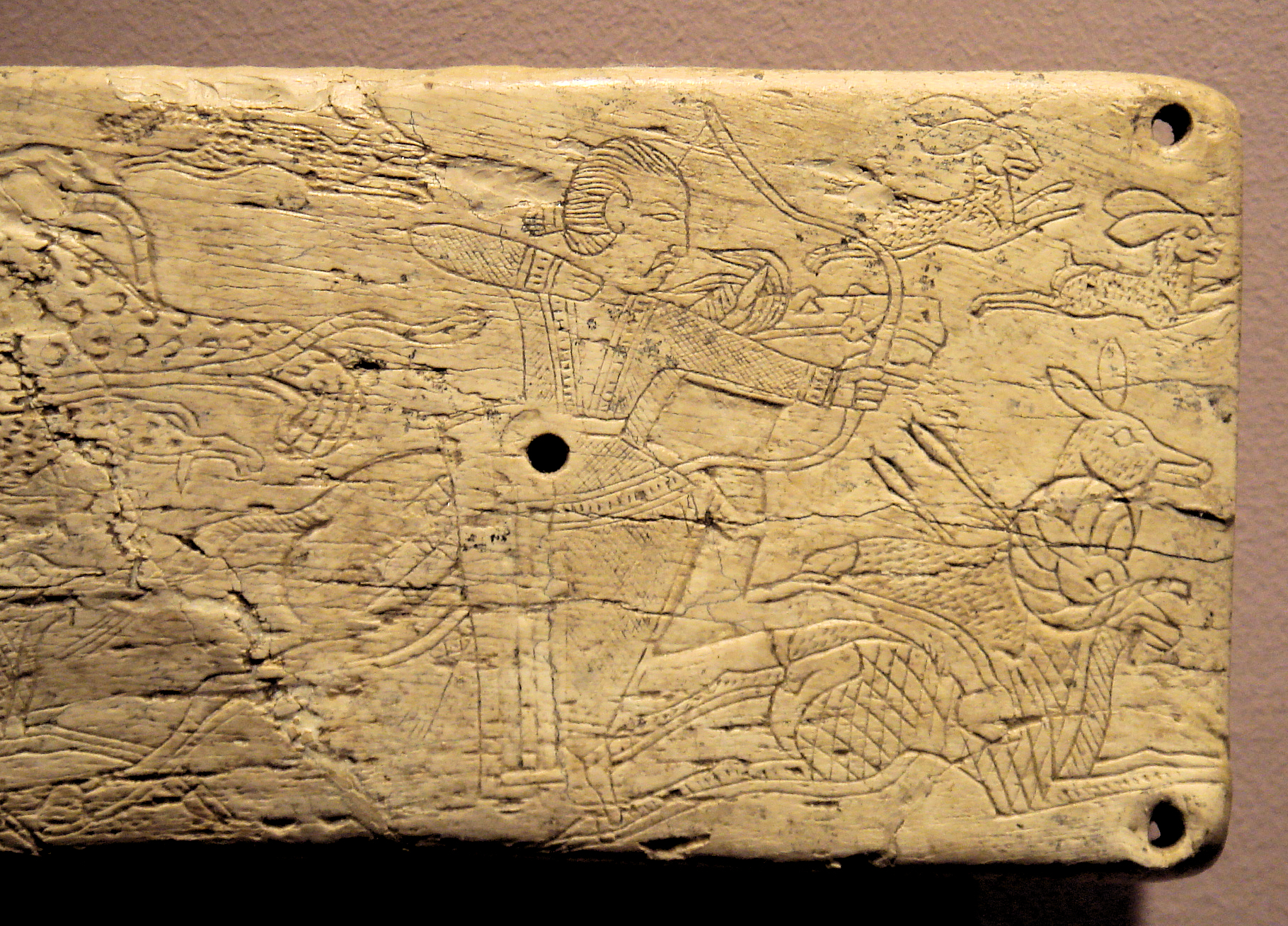
Right hunter detail, Takht-i Sangin, Temple of the Oxus, 1st century BC- 1st century AD

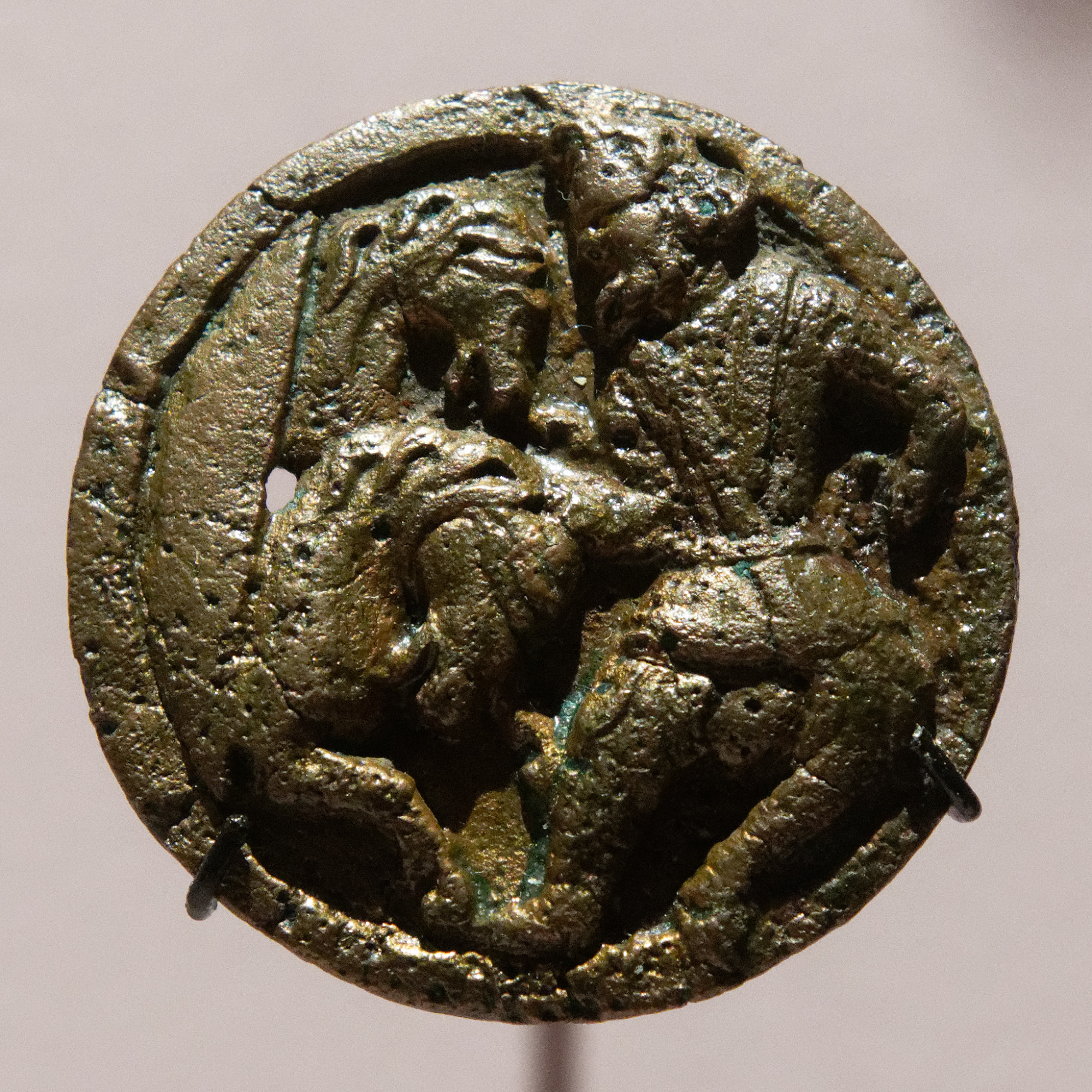
Medallion with man in Central Asian costume attending two horses, Takht-i Sangin, 2nd century BC-2nd century AD. The costume is said to be "Scythian".

== See also ==
- Ai-Khanoum
- Treasure of Begram
