= Punja =

Punja or Poonja may refer to:

- H. W. L. Poonja (1910-1997), Hindu teacher
- Rana Punja or Punja, Rajput chieftain of Panarwa, who took part in Battle of Haldighati with his followers, who were mainly Bhil archers.
- Hari Punja (born 1936), Indo-Fijian businessman and Chairman of Hari Punja Group of Companies
- Jinnahbhai Poonja, father of Muhammad Ali Jinnah
- Shubha Punja or Poonja, actress
- Yodhin Punja (1999), Emirati cricketer
- Punjas Rugby Series, between Fiji A and Tonga A sponsored by Fijian company Punja & Sons
- Major Muslim Rajput clans of Punja
- Punja Sahib gurdwara situated at Hasan Abdal, Pakistan

== See also ==
- Panja (disambiguation)
