= Pakistani Punjabi =

Pakistani Punjabi may refer to:

- Punjabis in Pakistan
- Western Punjabi (disambiguation), several language groups

== See also ==
- Indian Punjabi (disambiguation)
- Punjabi (disambiguation)
