= Panju =

Panju may refer to:

- Panju Island, an island in the Vasai Creek, near Mumbai
- Panju (actor), Indian actor
- Krishnan–Panju, Indian director duo

== See also ==
- Panja (disambiguation)
