= Indian Punjabi =

Indian Punjabi may refer to:

- Punjabis in India
- the variety of the Punjabi language used in India

== See also ==
- Eastern Punjabi (disambiguation)
- Pakistani Punjabi (disambiguation)
- Punjabi (disambiguation)
