= Lahndi =

Lahndi may refer to:

- Lahnda, a linguistic group of Punjabi dialects spoken in Pakistan
- Lahndi (food), a meat dish of Afghanistan and Pakistan

== See also ==
- Lahanda (disambiguation)
- Western Punjabi (disambiguation)
