= Eastern Punjabi =

Eastern Punjabi may refer to:

- the standard form of the Punjabi language as used in India (rather than Pakistan)
- the eastern Punjabi dialects spoken in both India and Pakistan

== See also ==
- Eastern Punjab (disambiguation)
- Western Punjabi (disambiguation)
- Indian Punjabi (disambiguation)
- Punjabi (disambiguation)
