= Western Punjab =

Western Punjab may refer to:

- Punjab, Pakistan, mostly used in contexts where Eastern Punjab refers to Punjab of India
- West Punjab, a former province of the dominion of Pakistan
- The western part of Punjab region

== See also ==
- Western Punjabi (disambiguation)
- Eastern Punjab (disambiguation)
- Central Punjab (disambiguation)
- Punjab (disambiguation)
