= Panja =

Panja may refer to:

== People ==
- Anath Bondhu Panja (1911–1933), Indian revolutionary and martyr
- Ajit Kumar Panja (1936–2008), Indian politician
- Bulbuli Panja, Indian television actress
- Ranjit Kumar Panja (1932–2006), Indian politician
- Shashi Panja (born 1962), Indian politician
- Shibaji Panja, Indian businessman from Kolkata
- Panja Vaisshnav Tej (born 1995), Indian actor

== Other uses ==
- Panjas, a French commune
- Parwanaya, or Panja, a festival in Mandaeism
- AMX LLC, formerly Panja Inc, an American manufacturer of video switching and control devices
- Panja-i-Mubarak, Handprint of Mughal emperor

== See also ==
- Panj (disambiguation)
- Punja (disambiguation)
- Panju (disambiguation)
- Panjaa, 2011 Indian film
- Pro Panja League, Indian arm wrestling competition
