= Western Punjabi =

Western Punjabi may refer to:

- Lahnda, also known as Western Punjabi, a linguistically defined group of Punjabi dialects primarily found in Western Punjab
- the group of all the Punjabi varieties, whether Lahnda or not, that are spoken in Pakistan
- the form of the standard Punjabi language in Pakistan (ISO 639-3: pnb)

== See also ==
- Lahanda (disambiguation)
- Lahndi (disambiguation)
- Western Punjab (disambiguation)
- Eastern Punjabi (disambiguation)
- Pakistani Punjabi (disambiguation)
- Punjabi (disambiguation)
