= Eastern Punjab =

Eastern Punjab may refer to:

- Punjab, India, mostly used in contexts where Western Punjab refers to Punjab of Pakistan
- East Punjab, a former province and state of India (1947–1966)
- Patiala and East Punjab States Union (1948–1956), a former state of India
- East Punjab Circuit, a Hindi film distribution circuit in India

== See also ==
- Eastern Punjabi (disambiguation)
- Western Punjab (disambiguation)
- Central Punjab (disambiguation)
- Punjab (disambiguation)
