= Lahanda =

Lahanda may refer to:

- Lahnda, a linguistic group of Punjabi dialects, primarily spoken in Punjab, Pakistan and its surroundings
- Lahanda, Bargarh, a village in Bargarh district, Odisha, India
- Lahanda, Kendujhar, a village in Kendujhar district, Odisha, India
- Lahanda, Sundargarh, a village in Sundargarh district, Odisha, India
- Lahanda, Uttar Dinajpur, a village in Uttar Dinajpur district, West Bengal, India

== See also ==
- Western Punjabi (disambiguation)
- Lahndi (disambiguation)
