= Punjab cricket team =

Punjab cricket team may refer to:

- Punjab cricket team (India)
- Punjab cricket team (Pakistan)

== See also ==
- Punjab Kings, a team in the Indian Premier League
- Southern Punjab cricket team (disambiguation)
- Punjab (disambiguation)
