= Central Punjab (disambiguation) =

Central Punjab can mean:

- Central Punjab, a region in Punjab, Pakistan
  - Central Punjab cricket team, a former sports team in Lahore, Punjab, Pakistan
  - Commander Central Punjab, a military officer of the Pakistan Navy
  - University of Central Punjab in Lahore, Punjab, Pakistan
- Majha (lit. 'middle/central'), a region of Punjab in India and Pakistan
  - Majhi dialect or Central Punjabi, a dialect of the Punjabi language from the Majha region
- Central Punjab, India, a region in Punjab, India
  - Central University of Punjab in Bathinda, Punjab, India

== See also ==
- Western Punjab (disambiguation)
- Eastern Punjab (disambiguation)
- Punjab (disambiguation)
