= Panj Free Economic Zone =

Panj Free Economic Zone is a free economic zone in Panj, Khatlon Province in Tajikistan.
