= Southern Punjab cricket team =

Southern Punjab cricket team may refer to:

- Southern Punjab cricket team (India)
- Southern Punjab cricket team (Pakistan)

== See also ==
- Punjab cricket team (disambiguation)
- South Punjab (disambiguation)
