= Punjab University =

Punjab University may refer to:

== India ==
- Punjab Agricultural University, a state agricultural university in Ludhiana, Punjab
- I. K. Gujral Punjab Technical University, a state university in Kapurthala, Punjab
- Maharaja Ranjit Singh Punjab Technical University, a state technical university in Bathinda, Punjab
- Panjab University, a public collegiate university in Chandigarh
- Punjabi University, a higher education institute in Patiala, Punjab

== Pakistan ==
- University of the Punjab or University of Punjab, a public research university in Lahore, Punjab

- University of the Punjab, Gujranwala, a public teaching and research university in Gujranwala, Punjab

- University of Central Punjab, a private-sector university in Lahore, Punjab
