= Punjab Assembly =

Punjab Assembly may refer to:

- Provincial Assembly of the Punjab, the unicameral legislature in Lahore, Pakistan
- Punjab Legislative Assembly, the unicameral legislature of the state of Punjab, northern India
- Punjab Legislative Assembly (British India), the legislature of the province of Punjab in British India, established by British authorities in 1910
