= Panj =

City in Khatlon, Tajikistan

- Location in Tajikistan
- Coordinates: 37°14′7″N 69°05′50″E
- Country: Tajikistan
- Region: Khatlon
- District: Panj

Population (2020)
  - Total: 12,500

Panj (Tajik: Панҷ) is a city in southern Tajikistan which is situated on the Afghan border, some 252 kilometres (157 mi) south of the capital Dushanbe. It is located along the north bank of the river Panj, from which it derives its name. The population of the town is 12,500 (January 2020 estimate).

== Name ==
In Soviet times Panj was known as Baumanabad, and later as Kirovabad. It has also been known as Pyandj, Pyandzh, Kirowabad, Sarai, Sarai-Kamar, Saray Komar, and Saray-Kamar.

It is not to be confused with the town of Dusti which has been also known as Pyandj, Pyandzh, Molotovabad and Dŭsty.

== FEZ Panj ==
The Panj Free Economic Zone is located here.
