= Saksanokhur gold buckle =

Ancient belt buckle

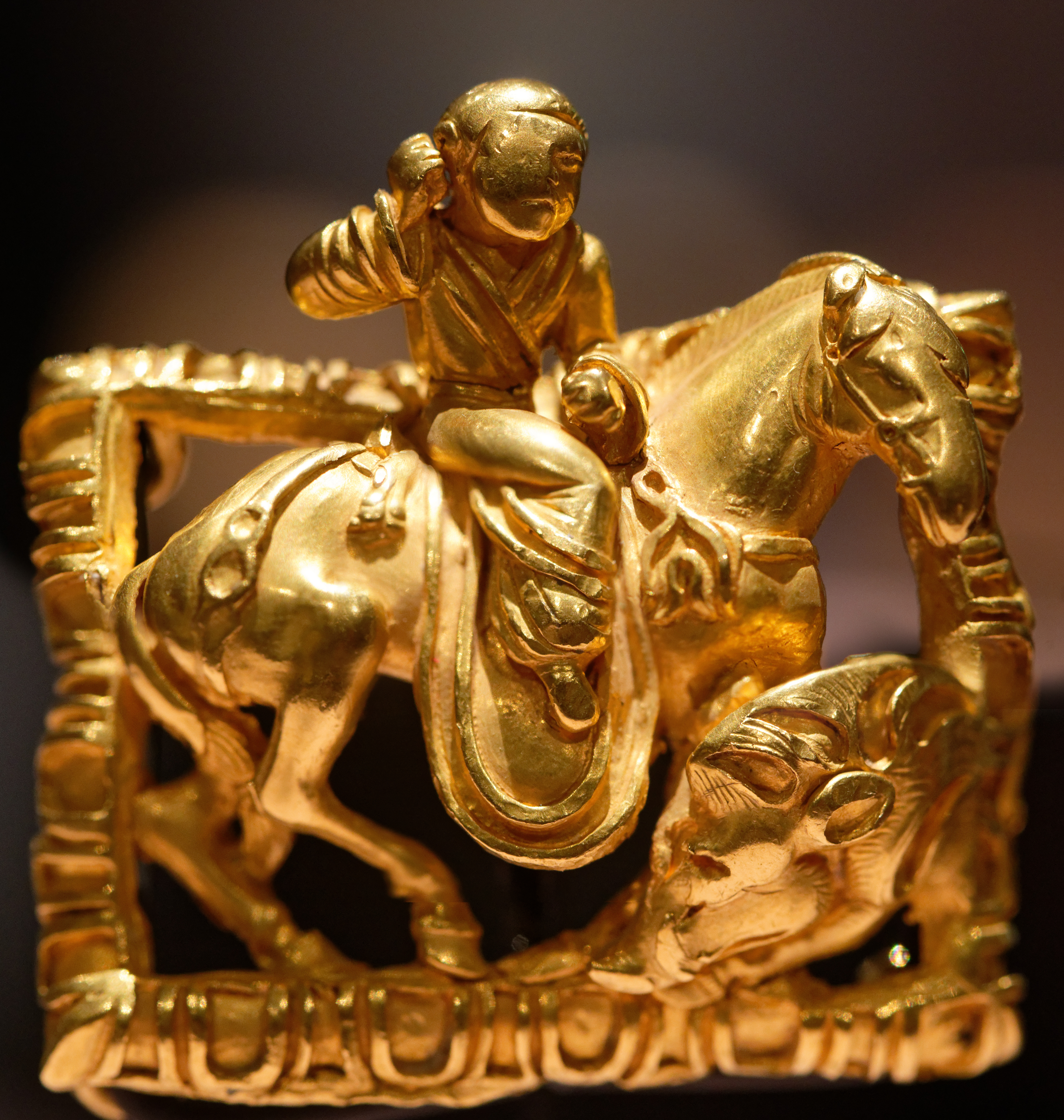
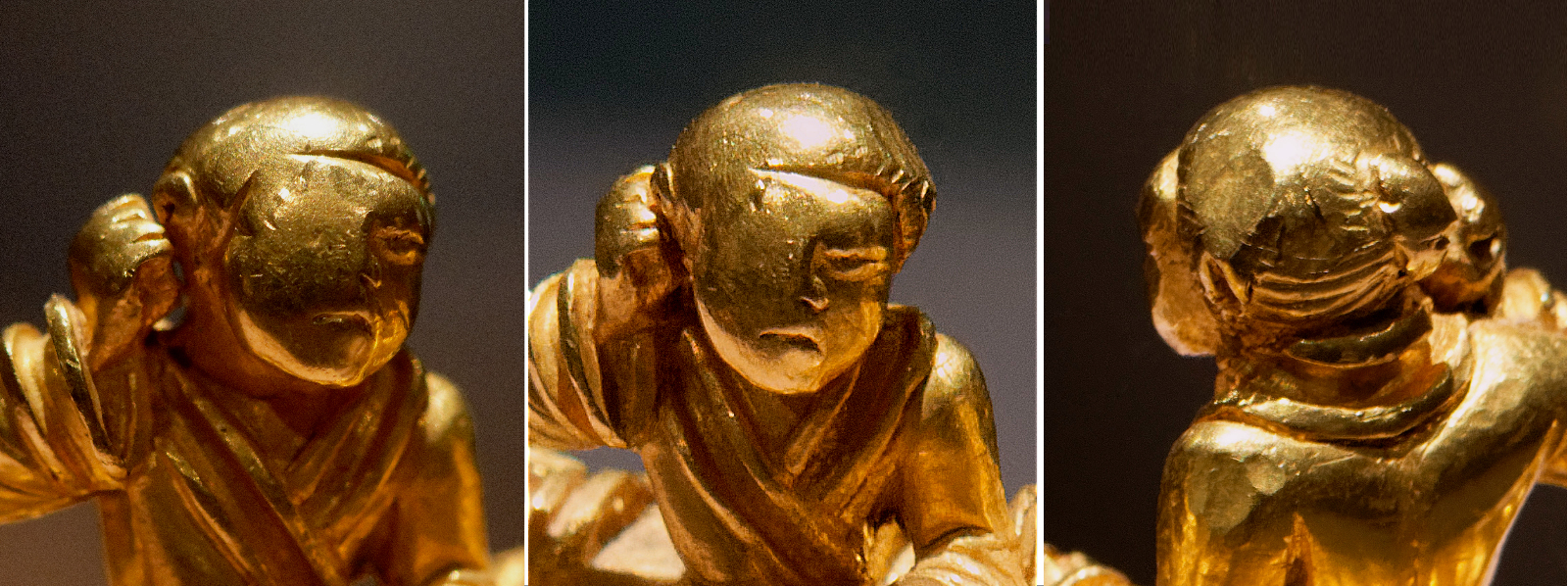
- A nomad horseman spearing a boar, discovered in Saksanokhur, South Tajikistan. National Museum of Antiquities of Tajikistan.
- Material: gold repoussé, formerly encrusted with light blue glass plate (boar and frame areas).
- Size: 5.4 x 5.3 cm
- Created: 2nd century BCE-2nd century CE
- Discovered: Saksanokhur; 37.5514°N 69.3906°E
- Present location: National Museum of Antiquities of Tajikistan

Location
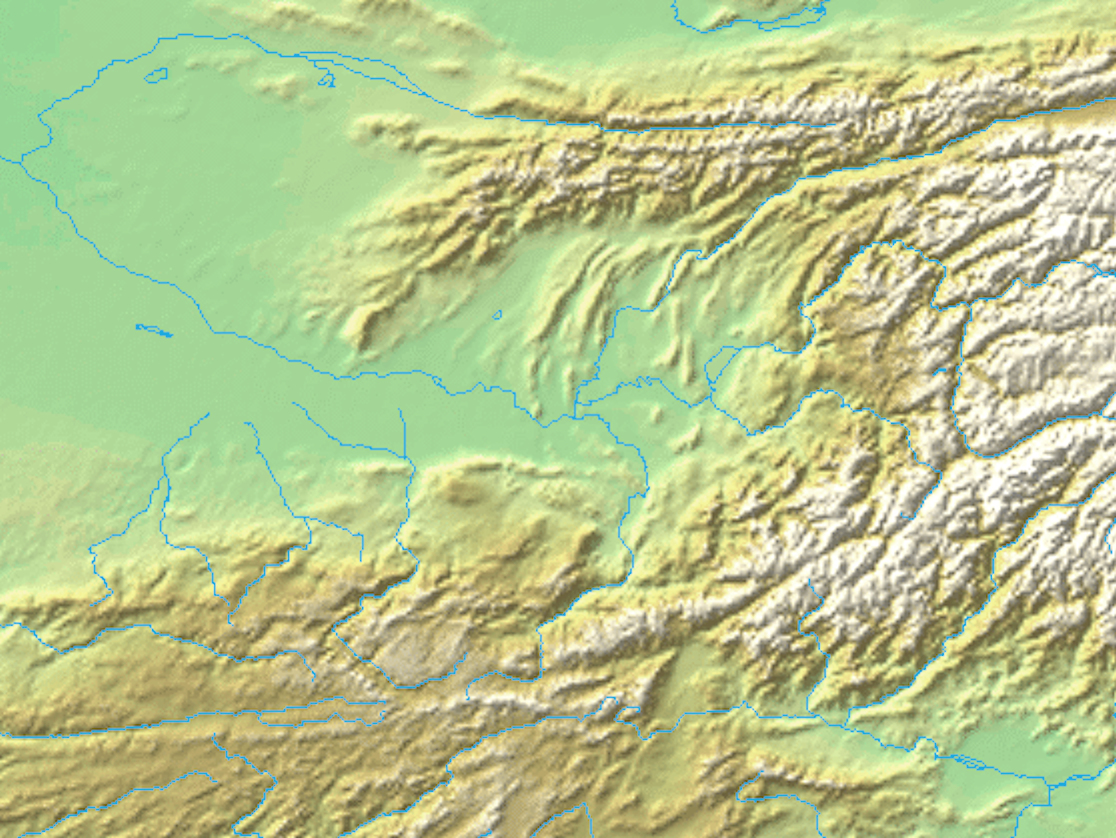

The Saksanokhur gold buckle is an ancient belt buckle in gold repoussé, discovered in the Hellenistic archaeological site of Saksanokhur, South Tajikistan. The plate represents a nomadic horserider spearing a boar, set within a rectangular decorative frame. The buckle is generally dated to the 1st–2nd century CE, although Francfort dates it earlier to the 2nd–1st century BCE, as do the curators for the Guimet Museum, and the National Museum of Antiquities of Tajikistan.

== Horserider ==
The horserider is generally only described as a "nomadic hunter". He wears a large robe with ample sleeves, held by a fine belt, over ample trousers reaching to the ankles. He was holding one or two spears, fragments of which remain. His hair is tied into a bun. The right side of his face has been damaged. His horse had elaborate trappings, the tail is covered and tied with a knot at the end, the mane is curt short.

More specifically, according to Francfort, the plate may have been made for a patron related to the Xiongnu, and may be dated to the 2nd-1st century BCE: the rider wears the steppe dress, his hair is tied into a hairbun characteristic of the oriental steppes (as also seen in the Boar hunter), and his horse has characteristically Xiongnu horse trappings (as also seen in the Plaque of the wrestlers). Some of these characteristics might also possibly be related to the Yuezhi.

== Authorship ==
The treatment of the figure as well as stylistic elements such as the frame using a Hellenistic egg-and-dart pattern, suggest a Hellenized artist. The site of Saksanokhur itself is otherwise known for many Hellenistic architectural remains, such as pillar and capitals.

== Parallels ==
Decorated belt buckles and plates are a common feature of Central Asian art in the period, but various materials can be used, such as horn or bone. These works of art typically represent nomadic figural scenes, with fighting or hunting episodes. Some of the most famous of these work of art are the Orlat plaques, or the plaques discovered at Takht-i Sangin. Various stylistic similarities have been found between the Orlat plaques and the Saksanokhur hunter, such as the position of the toes of his right foot, the mane of the horse with the forelock, the cover on the horse's tail, the tasseled horse harness, or the phalerae. The style of the Saksanokhur belt buckle is also very similar to several of the gold objects of Tillya Tepe, particularly regarding the Hellenistic style and the framing egg-and-dart motif.

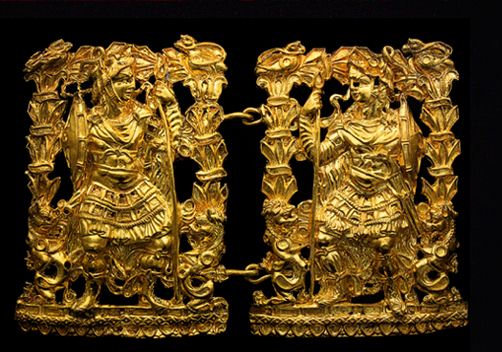
Men in armor, in Greek fighting gear. Tomb III. Gold repoussé artifact from Tillya Tepe, probably Yuezhi

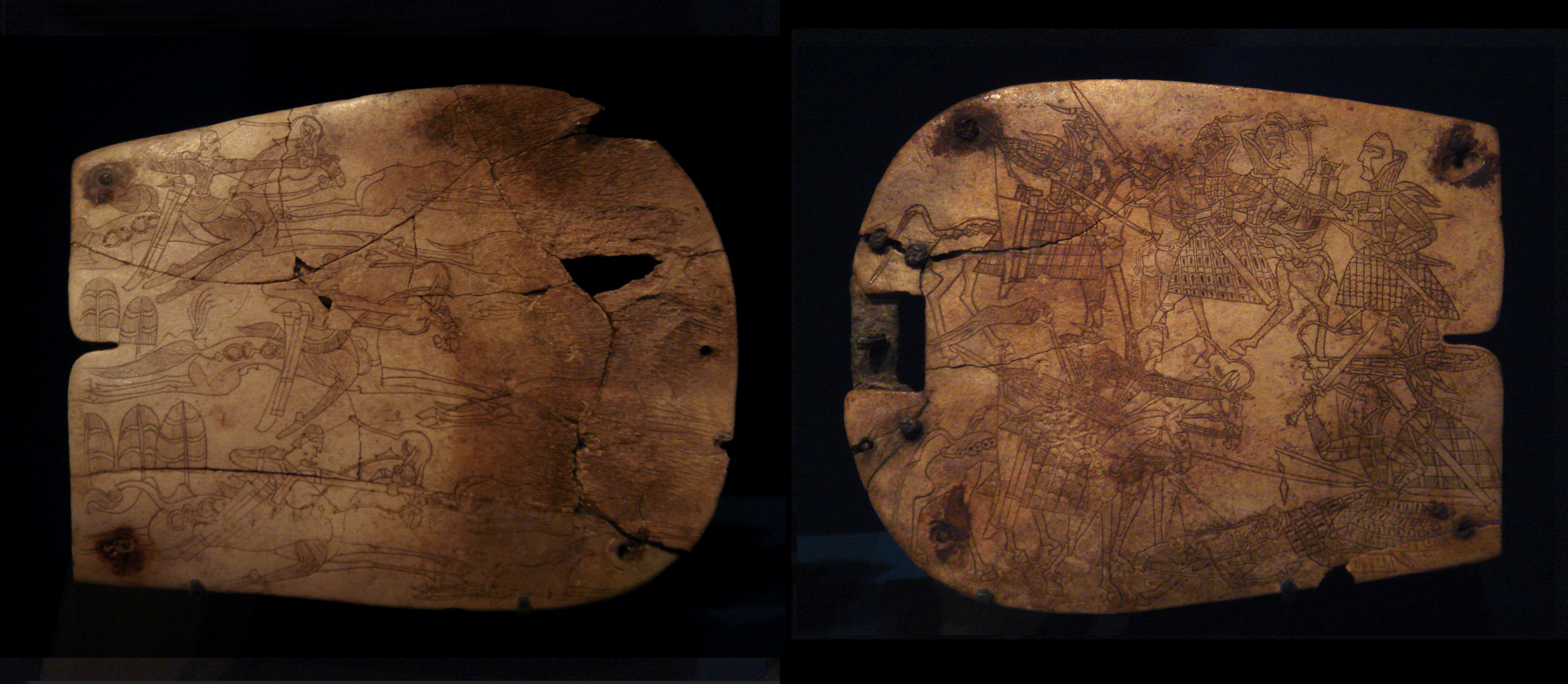
Orlat plaques, with fighting and hunting scenes, generally attributed to the Kangju

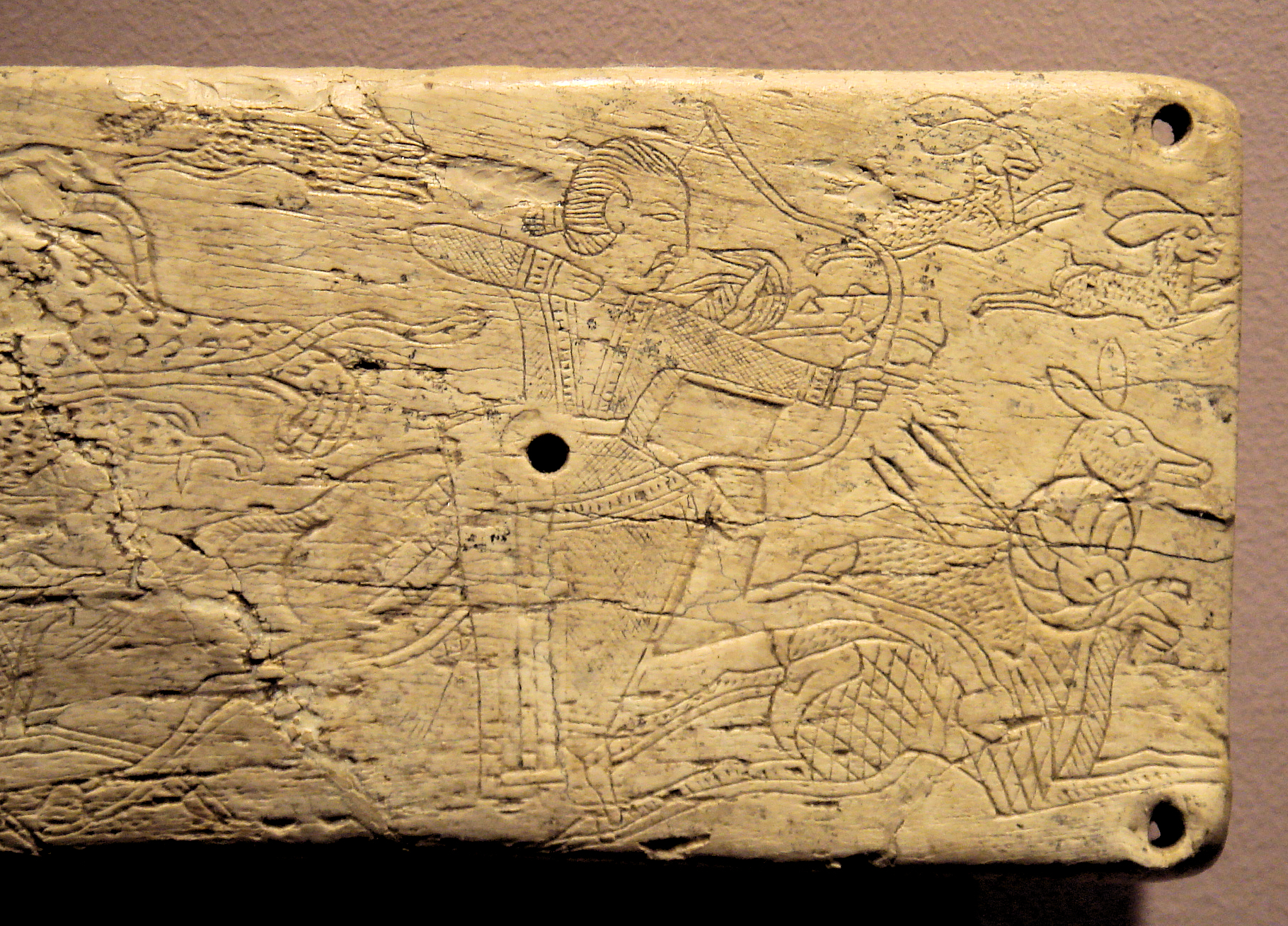
Hunters in an ivory plaque from Takht-i Sangin, with design comparable to the hunting scenes of the Orlat plaques.
