= Saksanokhur =

Coordinates: 37.5514°N 69.3906°E

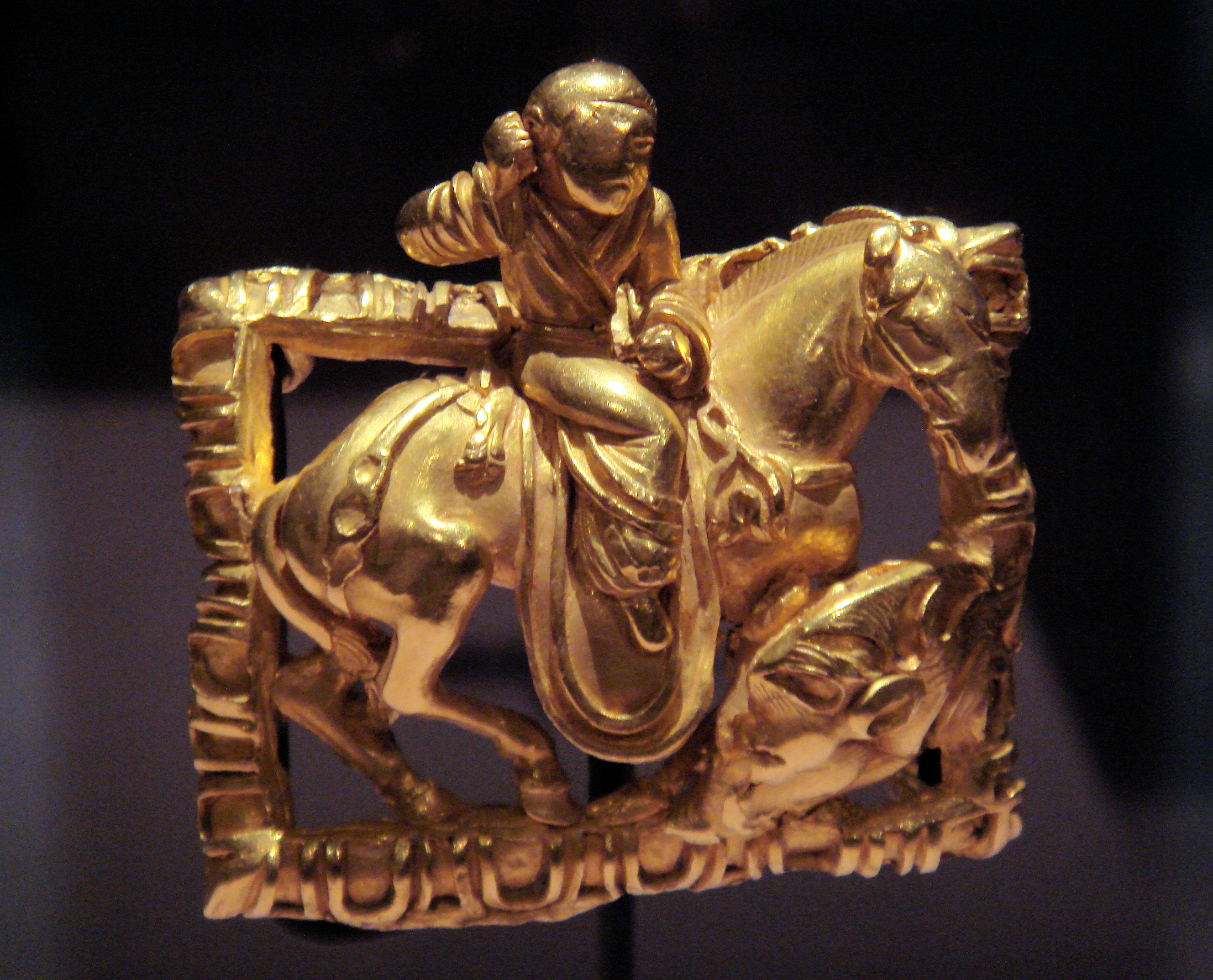
Saksanokhur gold buckle, with hunting scene, Saksanokur (near Farkhor), Tajikistan. 2nd-1st century BCE. Horse trappings are of Xiong-nu type, as is the hair bun of the rider.

Saksanokhur (Саксанохур) is the modern name of a Hellenistic settlement of the Greco-Bactrian and Kushan kingdoms, located at the village of Shaftolubogh near Farkhor on a plateau of arable land near the meeting of the Kyzylsu and Panj rivers, in the south of present-day Tajikistan.

The site consists of a rectangular settlement, with a citadel in the north-eastern corner, rising three metres above the surrounding territory. The main structure in the citadel is a fortified palatial building, with a large courtyard, measuring around 50 metres on each side. On the west, east, and south sides, the courtyard is surrounded by a narrow corridor which give access to a range of further rooms. On the south side of the courtyard there is a vestibule with four columns, known as an aiwan. The door of the aiwan leads to the south isolating corridor and from there to a large hall about 15 m wide and 22 m long with two columns. The columns all belong to the 'free' Corinthian order. The general layout of the palace, the 'isolating corridors', the aiwan, and the use of the free Corinthian order are all distinctive Bactiran features shared with the palatial complex at the nearby Greco-Bactrian site of Ai Khanoum. These factors suggest that, like the Ai-Khanoum palace, Saksanokhur was constructed in the 2nd century BC. Pottery finds also support this date.

Potters' quarters were excavated to the south of the citadel. All the pottery found there dates of the Kushan Period, through to the fourth century AD, indicating that the site continued to be occupied through Late Antiquity.

Saksanokhur was excavated by Soviet archaeologists from 1966 to 1967 and 1973 to 1977, when much of the site had already been levelled.

== See also ==
- Takht-i Sangin
- Torbulok

== Bibliography ==
- Литвинский, Б.А.; Мухитдинов, Х.Ю (1967). "Античиое городище Сакаснохур (Южиый Тажикистан)". АО. 3: 112–113.
- Литвинский, Б.А.; Мухитдинов, Х.Ю (1969). "Античиое городище Сакаснохур (Южиый Тажикистан)". Советская Археология. 2: 160–178.
- Древности Тажикистана (1985). Каталог выставки. Dushanbe. p. 115.
- Mairs, Rachel (2016). The Hellenistic Far East : archaeology, language, and identity in Greek Central Asia. Berkeley. pp. 79–82. ISBN 9780520292468.
- Lindström, Gunvor (2021). "Southern Tajikistan". In Mairs, Rachel (ed.). The Graeco-Bactrian and Indo-Greek world. Abingdon, Oxon: Routledge. pp. 298–299. ISBN 9781138090699.
