= Aleksandr Podushkin =

Kazakhstani archaeologist (born 1953)

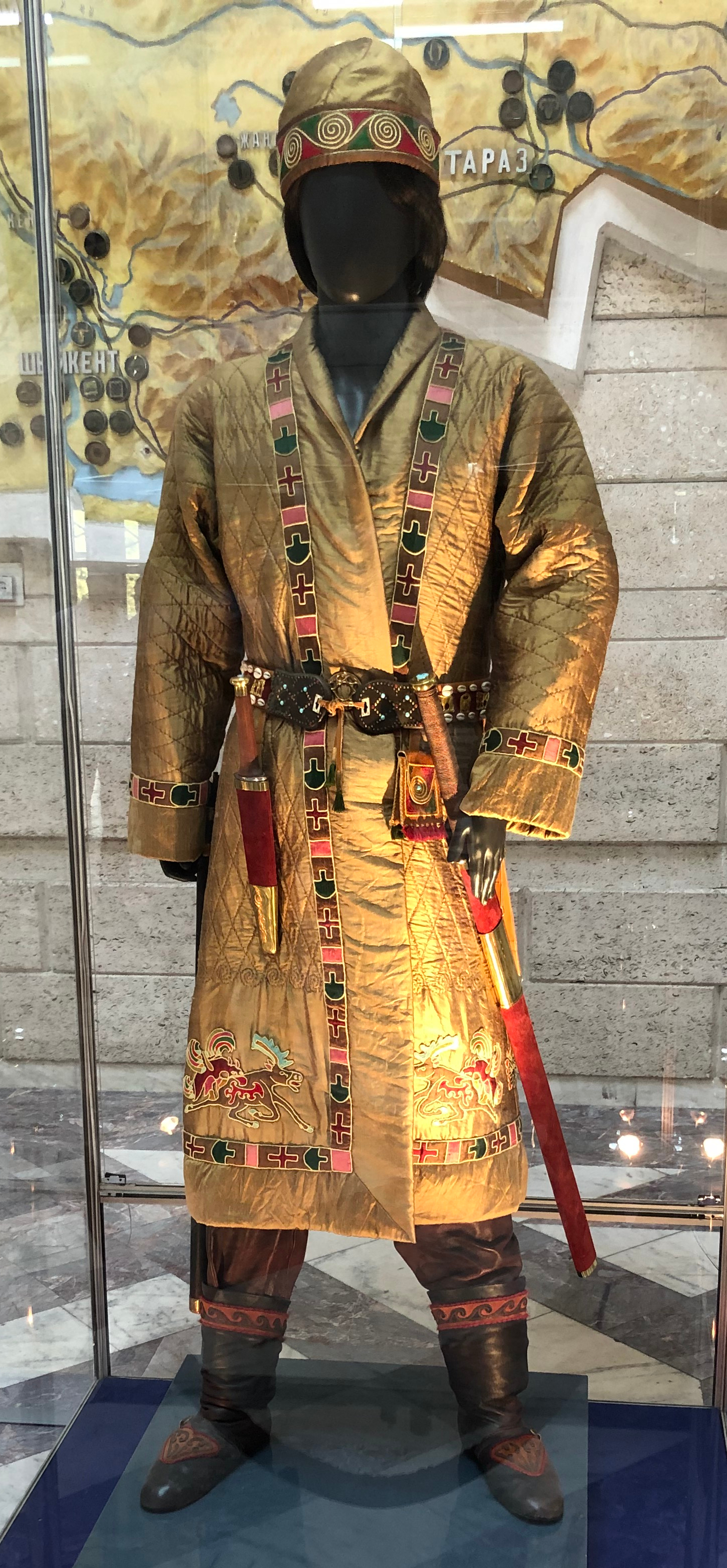
Reconstruction of a Xiongnu chief warrior, 2nd century BCE-1st century CE, by archaeologist A.N. Podushkin. Central State Museum of Kazakhstan.

Aleksandr Nikolaevich Podushkin (Александр Николаевич Подушкин, born March 19, 1953) is an archaeologist from Kazakhstan. He holds a doctorate in history and is a professor at the Southern Kazakhstan State Pedagogical Institute in Shymkent, Kazakhstan.

Podushkin specializes on the archaeology of Southern Kazakhstan, and on the cultures of the Sakas, Sarmatians and Kangju in the 4th century BCE – 4th century CE.

He has published four monographs and about ninety articles, some in collaboration with foreign scholars, such as Franz Grenet and Nicholas Sims-Williams.

== Works ==
- Podushkin, Alexsandr. "ART AND RELIGIOUS BELIEFS OF KANGJU: EVIDENCE FROM AN ANTHROPOMORPHIC IMAGE FOUND IN THE UGAM VALLEY (SOUTHERN KAZAKHSTAN)" (PDF). Silk Road Foundation.
- Aleksandr N. Podushkin. Arysskaia kul’tura Iuzhnogo Kazakhstana IV v. do n.e.–VI v. n.e. [The Arys Culture of southern Kazakhstan 4th century BCE–6th century CE]. Turkestan: Izdatel’skii tsentr MKTU im. A. Iassavi, 2000.
- Podushkin 2010. “Sarmaty v Iuzhnom Kazakhstane” [Sarmatians in southern Kazakhstan]. In: Drevnie kul’tury Evrazii. Materially mezhdunarodnoi nauchnoi konferentsii, posviashchennoi 100-letiiu A. N. Bernshtama. Sankt-Peterburg: Institut istorii material’noi kul’tury RAN, 2010: 207–17.
- Podushkin 2013 ´(SLJUDÀFKHVNLH DUWHIDNW\ JRURGLVKFKD .XO·WREHµ [Epigraphic artefacts of the Kul’tobe site]. In: Sogdiitsy, ikh predshestvenniki i nasledniki. Trudy Gos. Ermitazha, T. LXII. Sankt-Peterburg: Gos. Ermitazh, 2013: 82–95.
- Podushkin 2015. “Siunnu v Iuzhnom Kazakhstane: arkheologicheskii i istoricheskii konteksty” [Xiongnu in southern Kazakhstan: archaeological and historical contexts]. In: Drevnie kul’tury Severnogo Kitaia, Mongolii i Baikal’skoi Sibiri. Materially VI mezhdunarodnoi nauchnoi konferentsii. T. II. Khukh-Khoto (China), 2015: 507–14.
