= Boar hunter (Hermitage Museum) =

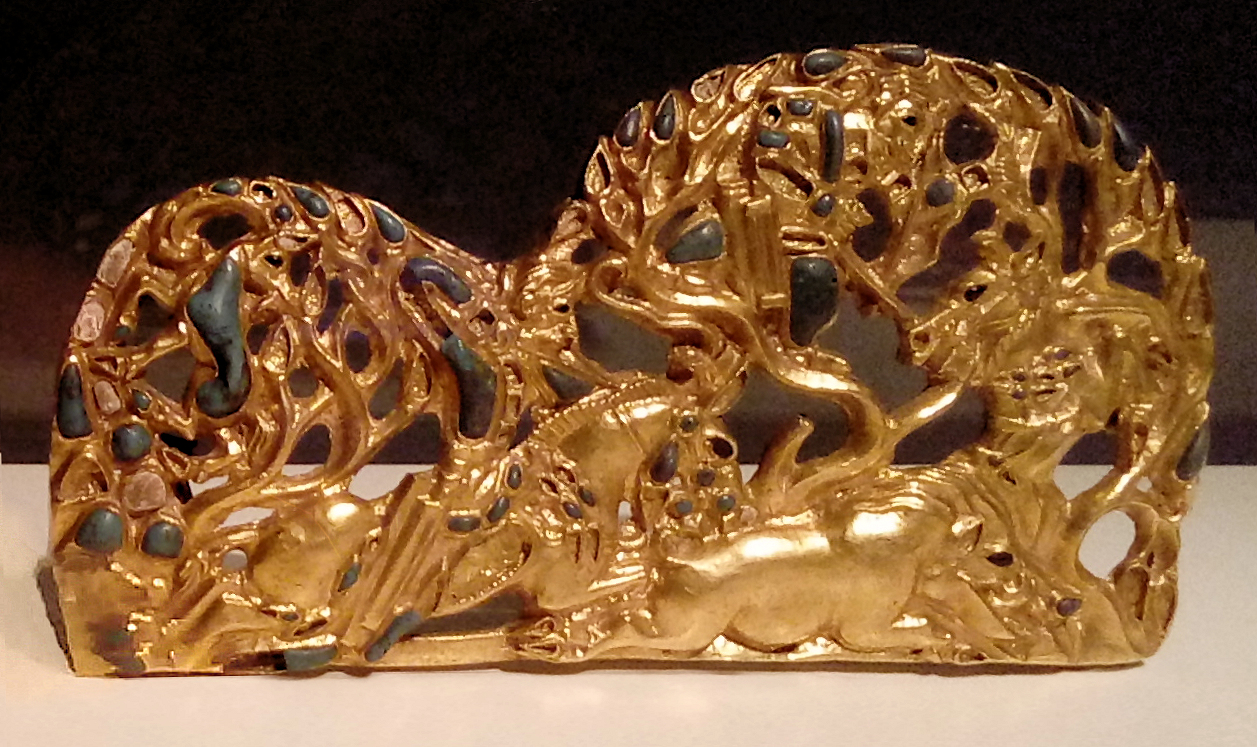
- Boar hunter (Hermitage Museum). Inventory number: Si 1726 - 1/69, 1/70
- Material: Gold repoussé, encrusted with light blue glass plate, coral and black stone.
- Size: 19.2 x 10.1 cm
- Created: 5th century BCE-1st century BCE
- Discovered: Southern Siberia
- Present location: Hermitage Museum
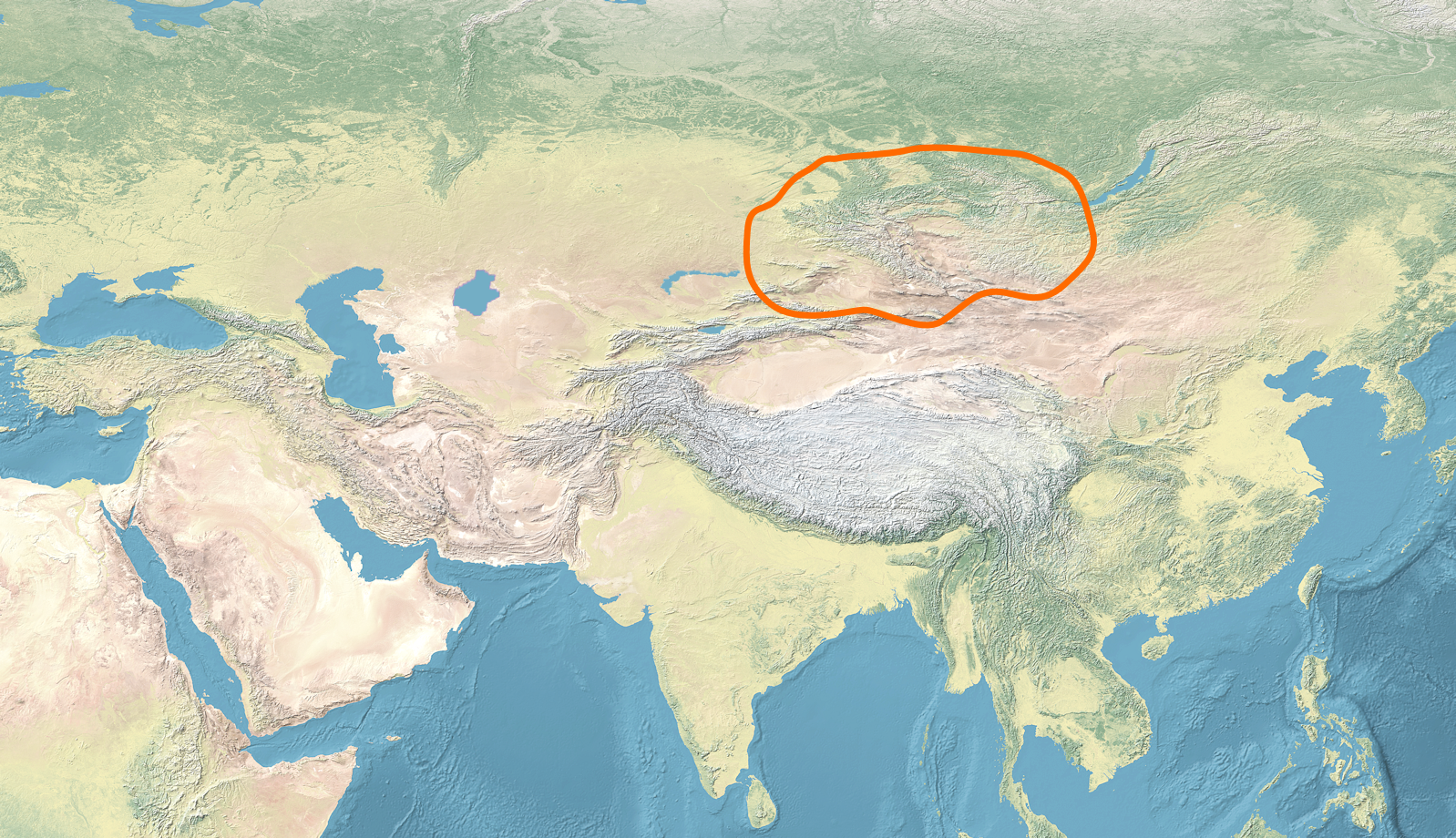
- Probable area of discovery, Southern Siberia

The Boar hunter from the Hermitage Museum is a set of two symmetrical gold repoussé belt plaques depicting a nomad horserider hunting a boar with a bow. The plaques are dated to the 3rd-1st centuries BCE, or even earlier to the 5th-4th centuries BCE. The plaques were found in Southern Siberia, in an unknown location somewhere in the area between modern Kazakhstan and the Altai Mountains. The plaques belonged to the broadly defined Scythian Animal style, and are relatively late examples of this kind of ornaments. They are often attributed to the Saka culture, but some Hunnic affinities have also been suggested. The plaques are also known in French as the plaques "à la chasse des Iyrques" ("of the hunt of the Iyrques"), after the famous account by Herodotus (IV. 22).

The nomad horserider is hunting a powerful boar with a Scythian bow. A horse, whose rider has climbed up a tree to take refuge, and a goat are looking at the scene. The hunter may be hero, and a possible Sarmatian. The depiction of the hunter is consistent with figures of Sakas from Tuva. The anthropomophical depiction in the plaque is rather similar to that of the Plaque of the wrestlers found in northern China, now in the Berlin Museum. Frankfort also mentions stylistic parallels with the Saksanokhur gold buckle, particularly the hairstyle.

The plaques were cast in textile, as shown by textile marks on the back, and were inlaid with blue glass paste imitating turquoise and coral, while the eyes are inset with black stones.

The plaques were part of the archaeological presents sent by Matvey Gagarin, Governor of Siberia in Tobolsk, to Peter the Great in Saint-Petersburg in 1716. It became part of the so-called "Siberian Collection of Peter the Great".
