= Kangju =

Ethnic group mentioned in Chinese history; probably the Sogdians

- 1st century BCE (?)–5th century CE
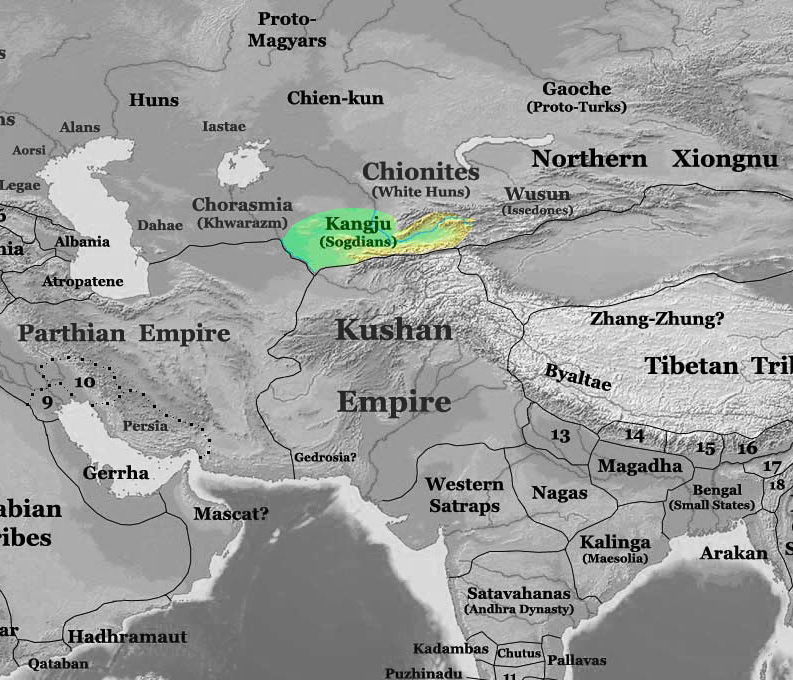
- The approximate territory of the Kangju c. 200 CE.
- Status: Independent state
- Capital: Kangu
- Common languages: Sogdian language
- Historical era: Late Antiquity
  - Established: 1st century BCE (?)
  - Disestablished: 5th century CE
- Today part of: Uzbekistan; Tajikistan

Kangju (Chinese: 康居; pinyin: kāngjū; Wade–Giles: K'ang-chü; Eastern Han Chinese: kʰɑŋ-kɨɑ < *khâŋ-ka (c. 140 BCE)) was the Chinese name of a kingdom in Central Asia during the first half of the first millennium CE. The name Kangju is now generally regarded as a variant or mutated form of the name Sogdiana. According to contemporaneous Chinese sources, Kangju was the second most powerful state in Transoxiana, after the Yuezhi. Its people, known in Chinese as the Kāng (康), were evidently of Indo-European origins, spoke an Eastern Iranian language, and had a semi-nomadic way of life. The Sogdians may have been the same people as those of Kangju and closely related to the Sakas, or other Iranian groups such as the Asii.

== Name ==
According to John E. Hill, a historian specialising in ancient Central Asia, "Kangju (W-G: K'ang-chü) 康居" was in or near the "Talas basin, [modern] Tashkent and Sogdiana". (According to Edwin Pulleyblank, Beitian – the summer capital of Kangju – was in or near modern metropolitan Tashkent.)

It is not clear whether the Chinese name 康居 Kangju was intended to transcribe an ethnic name, or to be descriptive, or both. 居 ju can mean: 'seat', 'central place of activity or authority; 'to settle down,' 'residence,' or 'to occupy (militarily).'... The term, therefore, could simply mean "the abode of the Kang," or "territory occupied by the Kang." ... As kang 康 means 'well-being', 'peaceful,' 'happy;' 'settle', 'stability,' Kangju can be translated as the 'Peaceful Land,' or 'Abode of the Peaceful (People).' ... Even if the name Kangju was originally an attempt to transcribe the sounds of a foreign name, it would still have carried the sense of a peaceful place to Chinese speakers, and the name 'Kang' would have had overtones of a peaceful people.

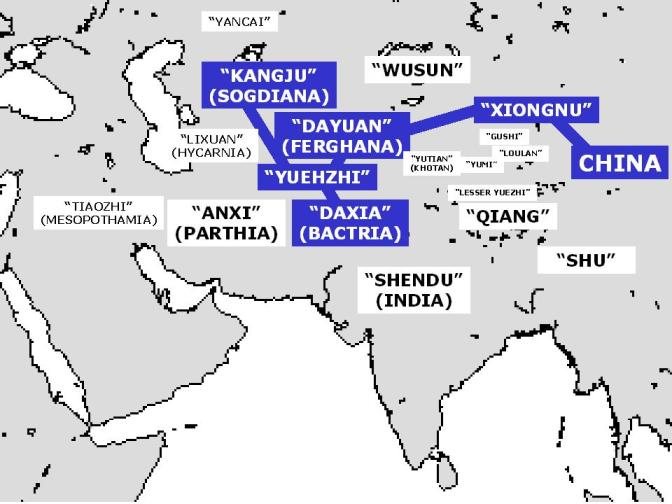
Countries described in Zhang Qian's report. Visited countries are highlighted in blue.

Later Chinese sources, during the Sui and Tang dynasties, refer to Kangju as the State of Kang (simplified Chinese: 康国; traditional Chinese: 康國). By that time it was part of the Göktürk Khaganate.

Pulleyblank linked Kangju to the Tocharian A word kāṅka-, probably meaning "stone" and proposed that the Kangju were originally Tocharians who had migrated westward into Sogdia and established themselves in Chach (modern Tashkent). Pulleyblank also suggested that the Jié (羯) tribe Qiāngqú (羌渠) might be Kangju people who had been incorporated into the Xiongnu tribal confederation. Pulleyblank further connected Kangju to Kànjié 瞰羯 (*Kamkar?) and the name Kankar given to the lower Yaxartes by Persian geographer ibn Khordadbeh. Ünal (2022) instead reconstructs *kaŋk- as the underlying form of Chinese transcription 康居 EHC *kʰɑŋ-kɨɑ > standard Chinese Kāngjū), proposes that it was an Iranian word meaning "stone", and compares it to Pashto kā́ṇay "stone". (Note: For further etymology, see Blažek (2022).)

Joseph Marquart, Omeljan Pritsak and Peter B. Golden have noted phonetic similarities between Kangju and Kengeres mentioned in the Orkhon inscriptions, the Kangarâyê in Transcaucasia, the city of Kengü Tarban, and the three Pecheneg tribes collectively known as Kangar mentioned by Constantine VII Porphyrogenitus. Nevertheless, all those connections remain hypothetical.

Archaeological evidence suggests that the Kangju spoke an Eastern Iranian language, which was probably identical to Sogdian, or derived from it.

== History ==
According to Chinese sources from the 2nd century BCE, Kangju lay north of the Dayuan and west of the Wusun, bordering the Yuezhi in the south. Their territory covered the region of the Ferghana Valley and the area between the Amu Darya and Syr Darya rivers, with the core territory along the middle Syr Darya. Since historians of Alexander the Great do not mention the existence of any political power in the area except the Khwarezmians, the Kangju must have appeared a little later. It is likely that the state of the Kangju emerged during the great upheaval in Central Asia following the withdrawal of the Yuezhi from Gansu and then the Ili Valley after their defeat by the Xiongnu and Wusun respectively. Chinese sources state that the Kangju were tributiaries of the Yuezhi in the south and the Xiongnu in the east.

The Kangju received the visit of Zhang Qian circa 128 BCE.

Kangju was mentioned by the Chinese traveller and diplomat Zhang Qian who visited the area c. 128 BCE, whose travels are documented in Chapter 123 of the Shiji (whose author, Sima Qian, died c. 90 BCE):

"Kangju is situated some 2,000 li [832 kilometers] northwest of Dayuan. Its people are nomads and resemble the Yuezhi in their customs. They have 80,000 or 90,000 skilled archers. The country is small, and borders Dayuan (Ferghana). It acknowledges sovereignty to the Yuezhi people in the South and the Xiongnu in the East.

Qian also visited a land known to the Chinese as Yancai 奄蔡 (literally "vast steppe"), which lay north-west of the Kangju. The people of Yancai were said to resemble the Kangju in their customs:

Yancai lies some 2,000 li (832 km) northwest of Kangju (centered on Turkestan at Beitian). The people are nomads and their customs are generally similar to those of the people of Kangju. The country has over 100,000 archer warriors, and borders a great shoreless lake [perhaps what is now known as the Northern Sea (Aral Sea, distance between Tashkent to Aralsk is about 866 km].

By the time of the Hanshu (which covers the period from 206 BCE to 23 CE), Kangju had expanded considerably to a nation of some 600,000 individuals, with 120,000 men able to bear arms. Kangju was clearly now a major power in its own right. By this time it had gained control of Dayuan and Sogdiana in which it controlled "five lesser kings" (小王五).

In 101 BCE, the Kangju allied themselves with the Dayuan, helping them preserve their independence against the Han.

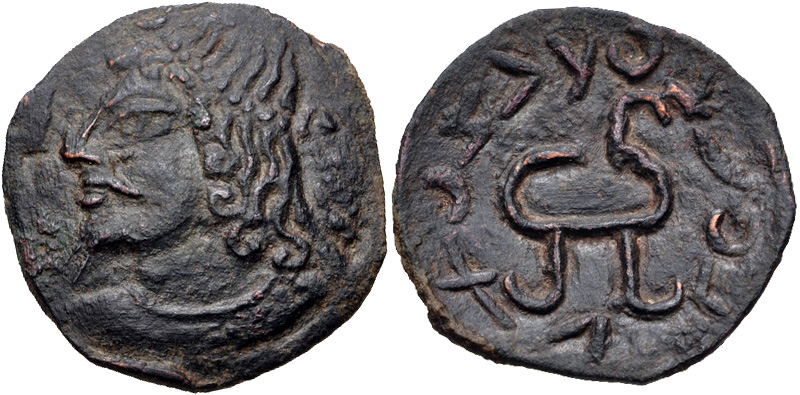
Kangju coin: obverse: ruler Wanunkhur of Chach; reverse: Kangju tamga. 3rd-6th centuries CE

The account on the 'Western Regions' in the Han dynasty Chinese chronicle, the Hou Hanshu, 88 (covering the period 25–220 and completed in the 5th century), based on a report to the Chinese emperor c. 125 CE, mentions that, at that time, Liyi 栗弋 (= Suyi 粟弋) = Sogdiana, and both the "old" Yancai (which had changed its name to Alanliao and seems here to have expanded its territory to the Caspian Sea), and Yan, a country to Yancai's north, as well as the strategic city of "Northern Wuyi" 北烏伊 (Alexandria Eschate, or modern Khujand), were all dependent on Kangju.

Y. A. Zadneprovskiy suggests that the Kangju subjection of Yancai occurred in the 1st century BCE. Yancai is identified with the Aorsi of Roman records. Scholars have connected name Alanliao to Alans. The Yan people of the Urals, paid tribute to the Kangju in furs. The Kangju established close connections with the Sarmatians, their western neighbors. The westward expansion of the Kangju obliged many of the Sarmatians to migrate further west, and it may therefore be concluded that the Kangju played a major in the great migrations of the time, which played a major role in world history. Through this expansion the Kangju gained control over key parts of the Silk Route. The Kangju state came to unite a number of regions which had sedentary, agricultural and nomadic populations. Although their territory was small, the fertility of the land and their sophisticated civilization enabled the Kangju to maintain a large population, becoming a major military power.

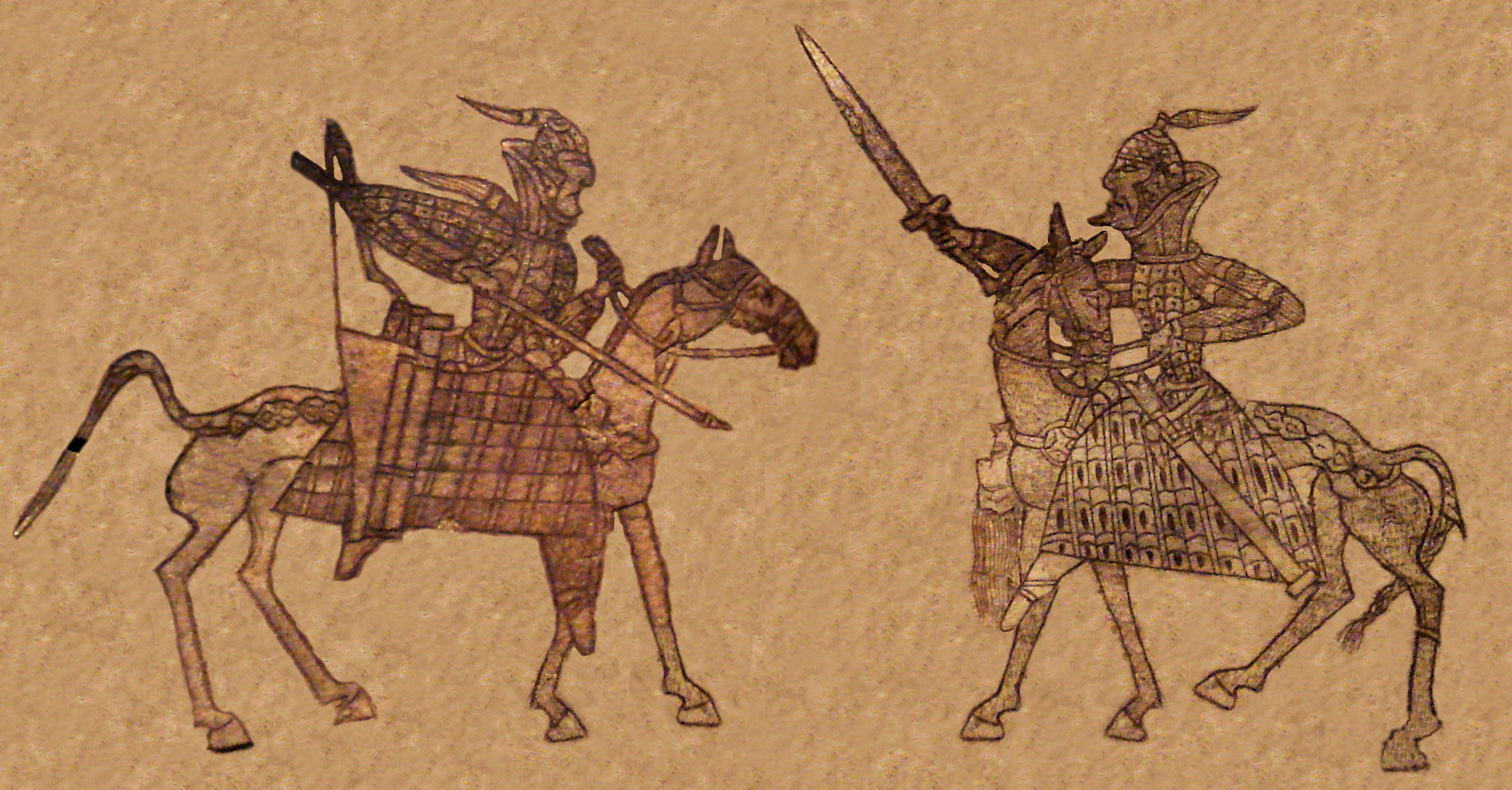
Battle scenes between "Kangju" Saka warriors, from the Orlat plaques. 1st century CE.

The Kangju were in frequent struggles with the Wusun, during which they in the mid 1st century BCE allied themselves with the northern Xiongnu. The Kangju ruler gave his daughter in marriage to the northern Xiongnu ruler Zhizhi, while the Kangju king married the daughter of the Xiongnu ruler. The Xiongnu and Kangju were initially successful, besieging the Wusun in 42 BCE. The Han however intervened, defeating and killing the northern Xiongnu ruler in at Talas in 36 BCE (Battle of Zhizhi). The Kangju ruler was subsequently forced to send his son as a hostage to the Han court. Nevertheless, the Kangju continued to send embassies to the Han court and pursued an independent policy, which they were able to maintain until the 3rd century CE. Evidence of Kangju independence can be seen in the coinage issued in the 2nd and 3rd centuries CE, during which they issued their own currency which was similar to that of Khwarezm.

The biography of the Chinese General Ban Chao in the Hou Hanshu says in 94 CE that the Yuezhi were arranging a marriage of their king with a Kangju princess. The Chinese then sent "considerable presents of silks" to the Yuezhi successfully gaining their help in pressuring the Kangju to stop supporting the king of Kashgar against them.

The 3rd century Weilüe states that Kangju was among a number of countries that "had existed previously and neither grown nor shrunk." The Kangju subsequently declined. Around 270 CE they were subdued by the Xionites. Like other Central Asian peoples, the Kangju probably became subsumed into the Hephthalites.

Kangju was later known as the State of Kang (康國) during the Sui and Tang dynasties. In the 8th century, some of them seem to have been adherents of Manicheanism.

== Culture ==
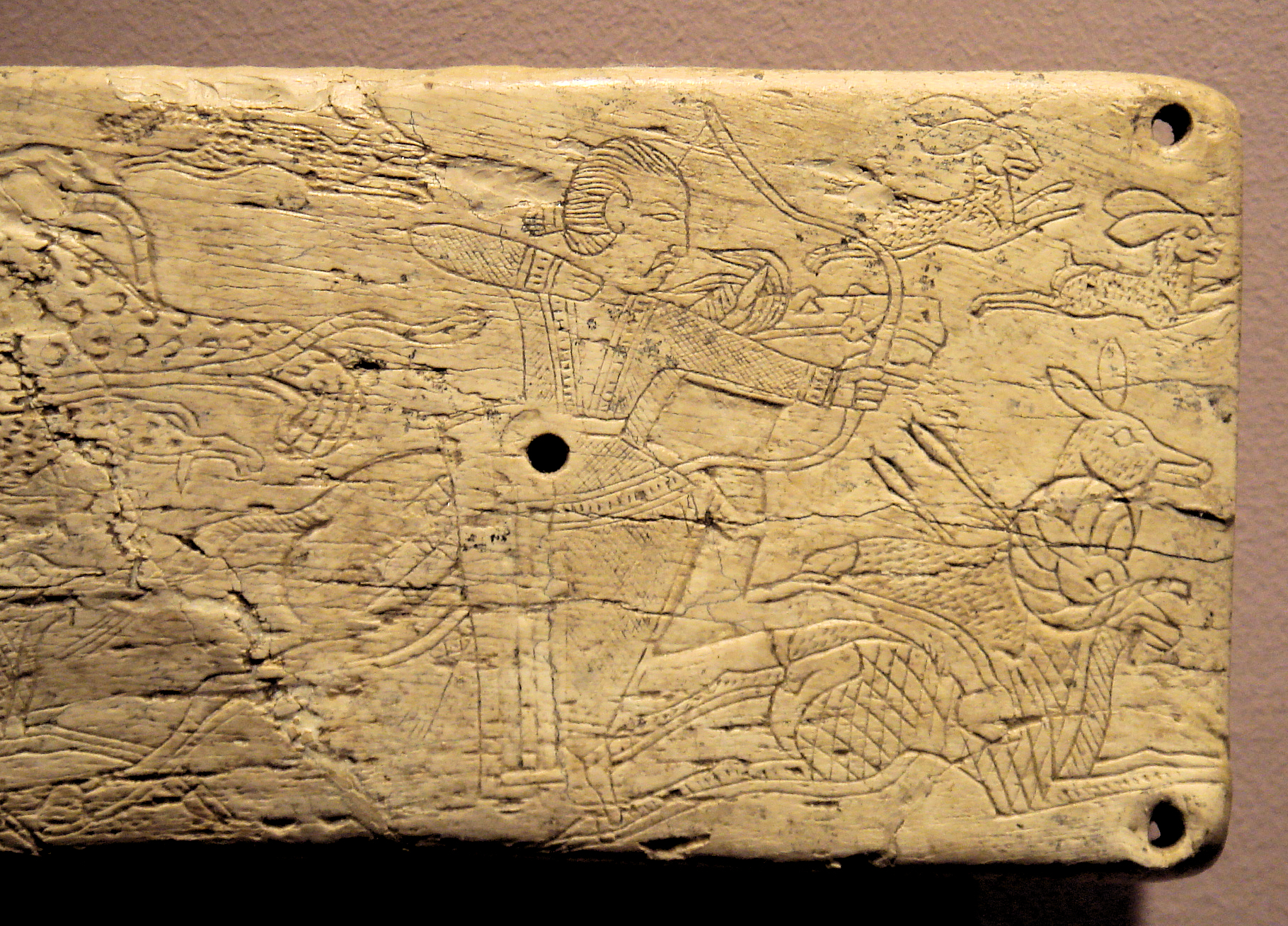
Hunters ivory plaque, Takht-i Sangin, Temple of the Oxus, 1st century BCE- 1st century CE. The design is comparable to the hunting scenes of the Orlat plaques.

The Book of Han describes the way of life of the Kangju elite. Its ruler spent his winter in the capital city of Beitian, and his summers at his steppe headquarters, which was a seven days' journey away on horseback.

The Kangju are regarded as an Indo-European people, and are generally held to have been an Iranian people identical with the Sogdians, or the closely related Asii. Sinologist Edwin G. Pulleyblank has however suggested that the Kangju could have been Tocharians.

The ruling elite of the Kangju consisted of nomadic tribes whose customs were very similar to those of the Yuezhi. Kangju burials of the early period have been excavated at Berk-kara and Tamdî, in which the dead were placed in pit-graves, often covered with logs, under kurgan mounds. These graves often contain hand-made pots, iron swords, arrow-heads and jewellery. The burials show that the traditional culture of the Kangju resembled characteristics of the Saka. From the beginning of the Christian era "catacomb graves" (in shaft and chamber tombs) became widespread. This is seen from the burials of the Kaunchi and Dzhun cultures of the 1st to the 4th centuries CE, which are generally accepted as having belonged to the Kangju. The Kangju regarded the ram as a noble animal.

References from written sources and archaeological finds show that the Kangju reached a considerable level of agricultural sophistication. Much of the population consisted of a sedentary farming population. Wide canals from the Kangju period have been discovered, with the land area under irrigation of the Amu Darya and Syr Darya being four times greater than today. The irrigation systems of Central Asia reached their highest levels of development under the Kangju-Kushans and was in fact superior to those fully developed in the Middle Ages.

== Archaeology ==
=== Kaunchi culture ===
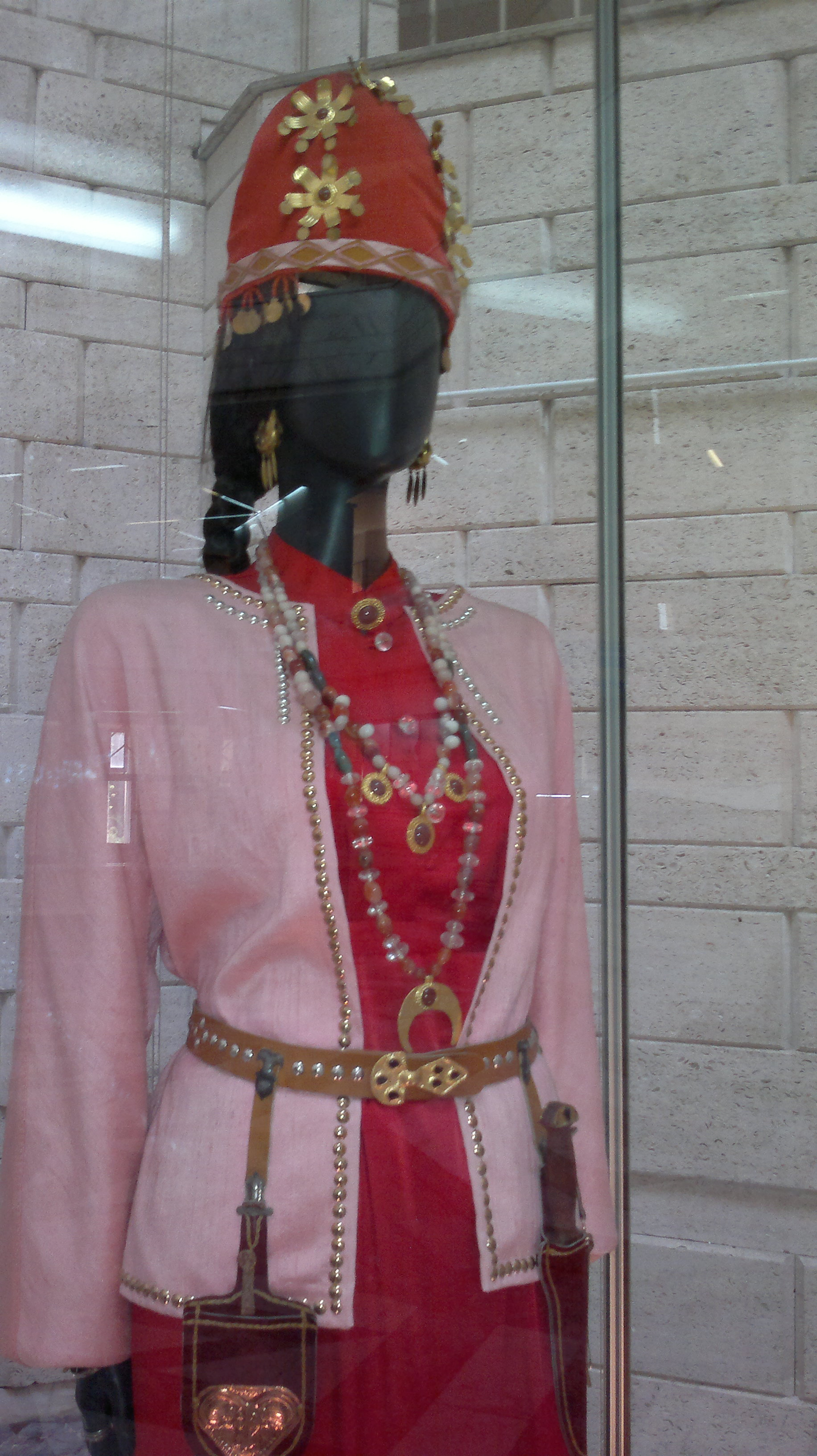
Reconstruction of a Kangju woman, 2nd century BCE-4th century CE (), by archaeologist A.N. Podushkin. Central State Museum of Kazakhstan

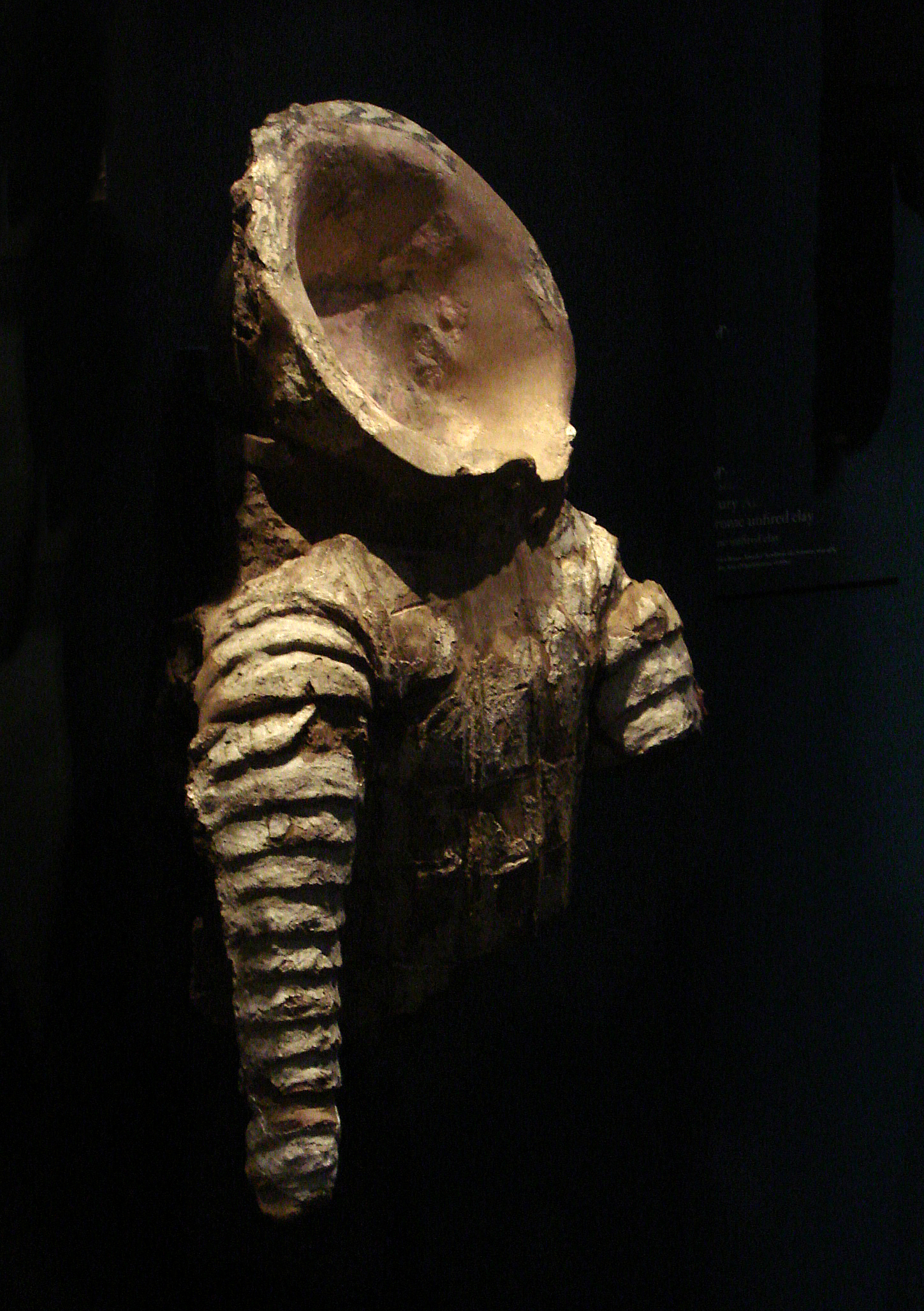
Model of a Saka cataphract armour with neck-guard, from Khalchayan. 1st century BCE. Museum of Arts of Uzbekistan, nb 40.

Kangju appears to be a civilisation known to Soviet archaeologists as the "Kaunchi Culture", dating from the 2nd century BCE to the early 8th century CE, and centred on the middle course of the Syr Darya and its tributaries: the Angren, Chirchik, and Keles. The culture was named after an ancient townsite now known as Kaunchi-Tepe, which was first studied by G. V. Grigoriev in 1934–37.

Settlements of the Kaunchi culture were typically located in proximity to water and usually have monumental oval buildings in the center, at times with a defensive wall. The largest settlement was a 150 hectare city known apparently as Kang (Sanskrit Kanka), south of modern Tashkent and founded in the 1st century CE. Kang had a square layout, encircled by a wall with inner passages.

The settlements were surrounded by kurgan burials of a catacomb type with long dromoses, crypts, and burial vaults, with horse bone trappings and rites typical of nomads.

The people predominantly practiced cattle husbandry and nonirrigated agriculture (grain cultures of millet, barley, wheat, and rice, cotton, melons, and fruits).

Materials typical of the culture are typical hand-formed pottery: khums (large bowls for water and produce), pots, pitchers, and cups adorned with ram's head on the handles. In the 1st century CE ceramics made on a potter's wheel became more common. A ram's head motif at first common was replaced by a bull's head during the late 3rd and early 4th centuries. At that period weapons started appearing in the kurgans.

Kaunchi-type sites apparently spread from the Otrar region along Syr Darya to the south of Tashkent. The Kaunchi culture significantly impacted the archeological cultures in the vast territories of the Middle Asia.

=== Inscriptions ===
Some important inscriptions were discovered recently that provide information about Kangju and its contacts with China.

- A dozen wooden slips with Chinese writing were found at the Xuanquan site in Dunhuang, China. They are dated to the late Western Han dynasty (206 BCE – 24 CE).
- A set of Sogdian inscriptions discovered by A. N. Podushkin in his excavations at Kultobe in Kazakhstan; they were analyzed and deciphered by Nicholas Sims-Williams. They complement the existing Chinese historical records about Kangju. Sims-Williams also assigned a likely date to these inscriptions.

== Genetics ==
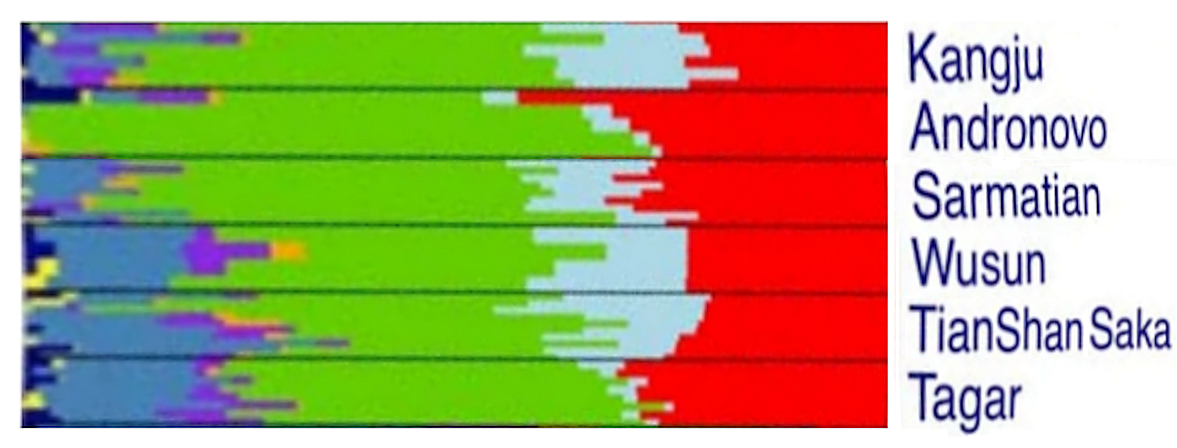
Genetic proximity of Eastern Indo-Europeans: the Wusun had great genetic proximity with the Kangju, the Andronovo, the Sarmatians, the Sakas or the Tagar populations.

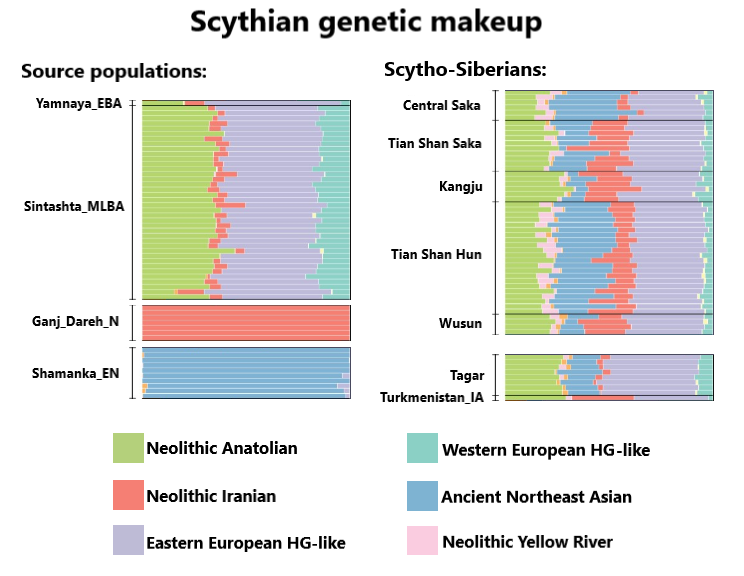
Genetic makeup of Iron Age Central Asian Scythians. The three main ancestry components are shown in green, red and violet representing the ancestries maximized in Anatolian farmers, Iranian farmers, and Hunter Gatherers from West Siberia, respectively.

A genetic study published in Nature in May 2018 examined the remains of 6 Kangju buried between ca. 200 CE and 300 CE. The 2 samples of Y-DNA extracted belonged to the paternal haplogroups R1a1a1b2a and R1a1a1b2a2b, while the 6 samples mtDNA extracted belonged to the maternal haplogroups H6a1a, C4a1, U2e2a1, HV13b, U2e1h and A8a1. The authors of the study found that the Kangju and Wusun had less East Asian admixture than the Xiongnu and Sakas. Both the Kangju and Wusun were suggested to be descended from Western Steppe Herders (WSHs) of the Late Bronze Age who admixed with Siberian hunter-gatherers and peoples related to the Bactria–Margiana Archaeological Complex.

A 2021 study reconstructed the genetic profile of the Kangju as derived from the Sarmatians for 90%, with the rest (10%) being derived from BMAC ancestry.

== Notes and references ==
=== Sources ===
- Blažek, Vaclav (2022). "Baltic *kalu̯ā ′hill′". Vilnius University Open Series: 65–77. doi:10.15388/Baltistikos_platybese.2022.3.
- Damgaard, P. B.; et al. (9 May 2018). "137 ancient human genomes from across the Eurasian steppes". Nature. 557 (7705). Nature Research: 369–373. Bibcode:2018Natur.557..369D. doi:10.1038/s41586-018-0094-2. hdl:1887/3202709. PMID 29743675. S2CID 13670282.
- Golden, Peter B. (1992). An Introduction to the History of the Turkic People. Otto Harrassowitz, Wiesbaden.
- Hulsewé, China in Central Asia: The Early Stage: 125 BC - AD 23; an Annotated Transl. of Chapters 61 and 96 of the History of the Former Han Dynasty. A.F.P. Hulsewé, with an Introd. by M.A.N.Loewe.
- Harmatta, János (1 January 1994). "Introcution". In Harmatta, János (ed.). History of Civilizations of Central Asia: The Development of Sedentary and Nomadic Civilizations, 700 B. C. to A. D. 250. UNESCO. pp. 19–23. ISBN 92-3-102846-4.
- Hill, John E. 2004. The Peoples of the West from the Weilüe 魏略 by Yu Huan 魚豢: A Third Century Chinese Account Composed between 239 and 265 CE. Draft annotated English translation.
- Hill, John E. (2015) Through the Jade Gate - China to Rome: A Study of the Silk Routes 1st to 2nd centuries CE. CreateSpace, North Charleston, South Carolina. ISBN 978-1500696702.
- Kyzlasov, L. R. (1 January 1996). "Northern Nomads". In Litvinsky, B. A. (ed.). History of Civilizations of Central Asia: The crossroads of civilizations, A.D. 250 to 750. UNESCO. pp. 315–325. ISBN 92-3-103211-9.
- Mukhamedjanov, A. R. (1 January 1994). "Economy and Social System in Central Asia in the Kushan Age". In Harmatta, János (ed.). History of Civilizations of Central Asia: The Development of Sedentary and Nomadic Civilizations, 700 B. C. to A. D. 250. UNESCO. pp. 265–291. ISBN 92-3-102846-4.
- Loewe, Michael; Shaughnessy, Edward L. (1999). The Cambridge History of Ancient China: From the Origins of Civilization to 221 BC. Cambridge University Press. ISBN 0-5214-7030-7.
- The Tarim Mummies: Ancient China and the Mystery of the Earliest Peoples from the West. J. P. Mallory and Victor H. Mair. Thames & Hudson. London. (2000), ISBN 0-500-05101-1
- Narasimhan, Vagheesh M.; et al. (6 September 2019). "The formation of human populations in South and Central Asia". Science. 365 (6457). American Association for the Advancement of Science: 1230–1234. doi:10.1126/science.aat7487. PMC 6822619. PMID 31488661.
- Schuessler, Axel. 2007. An Etymological Dictionary of Old Chinese. University of Hawaii Press.
- Sinor, Denis (1 March 1990). The Cambridge History of Early Inner Asia, Volume 1. Cambridge University Press. ISBN 0-521-24304-1.
- Liu, Xinru: Migration and Settlement of the Yuezhi-Kushan. Interaction and Interdependence of Nomadic and Sedentary Societies in: Journal of World History, 12 (No. 2) 2001, p. 261-292. See
- de la Vaissière, Étienne (2013). "Iranian in Wusun? A tentative reinterpretation of the Kultobe Inscription". Commentationes Iranicae. Vladimiro F. Aaron Livschits Nonagenario Donum Natalicium: 320–325.
- Watson, Burton (1993). Records of the Great Historian, Han Dynasty II. Columbia University Press. ISBN 0-231-08167-7.
- Wood, Frances (1 September 2004). The Silk Road: Two Thousand Years in the Heart of Asia. University of California Press. ISBN 0-520-24340-4.
- Zadneprovskiy, Y. A. (1 January 1994). "The Nomads of Northern Central Asia After The Invasion of Alexander". In Harmatta, János (ed.). History of Civilizations of Central Asia: The Development of Sedentary and Nomadic Civilizations, 700 B. C. to A. D. 250. UNESCO. pp. 457–472. ISBN 92-3-102846-4.
- Drevnosti Chardary, Alma-Ata, 1968 (In Russian)
- Grigoriev G.V., Kaunchi-Tepe (excavations of 1935), Tashkent, 1940 (In Russian)
- Isamiddin M., Suleymanov R.Kh., Yerkurgan (stratigraphy and periodization), Tashkent, 1984 (In Russian)
- Levina L.M. Ceramics of lower and middle Syrdarya//Works of Khorezm Archeological & Ethnographic Expedition, Vol 17, Moscow, 1971 (In Russian)
- The Great Soviet Encyclopedia, 3rd Edition, 1970-1979 (In Russian)
