= Torbulok =

- Торбулок (Tajik)
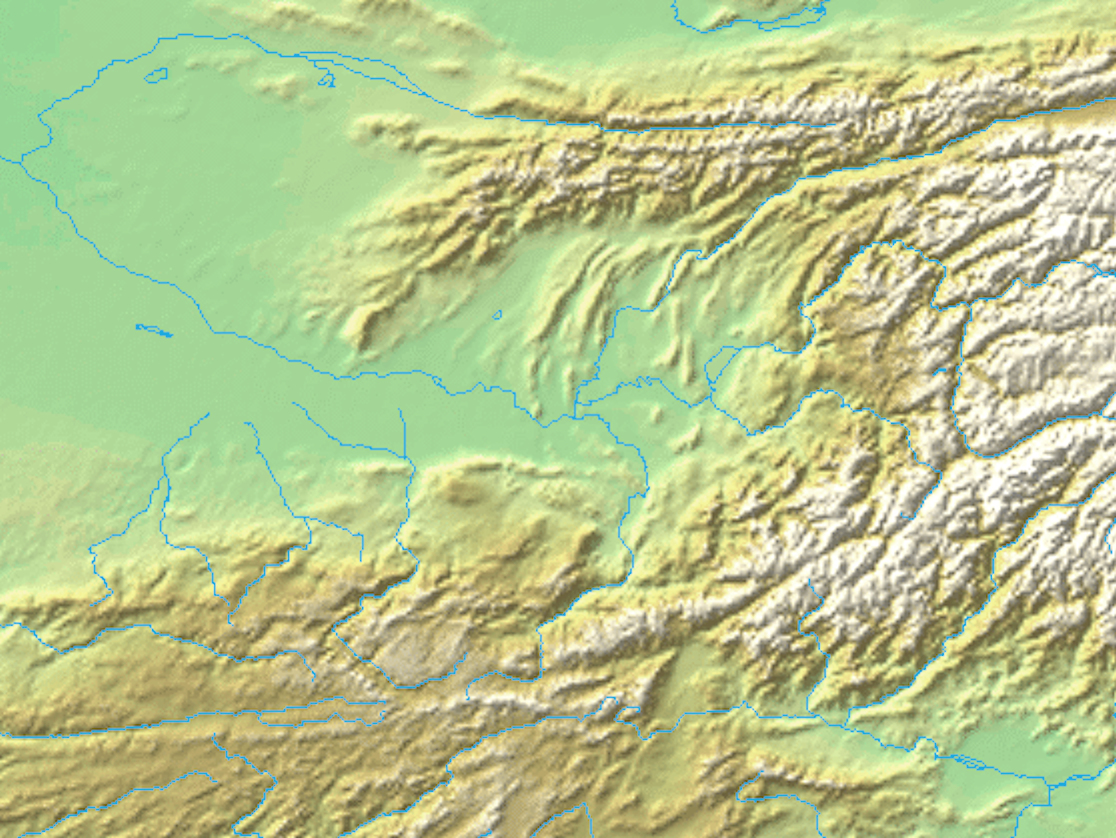
- Location within Tajikistan Location within Bactria
- 37.9388°N 69.1822°E
- Type: Sanctuary
- Periods: Hellenistic period
- Cultures: Greek; Bactrian
- Satellite of: Greco-Bactrian kingdom
- Location: Danghara District, Tajikistan

History
- Built: ca. 300 BC
- Abandoned: ca. 1st century BC

Site notes
- Excavation dates: 2013-2018
- Archaeologists: Gunvor Lindström; T. G. Filimonova

Torbulok (Tajik: Торбулок, "Four Springs") is an archaeological site located in a foothill zone 50 km northwest of the Kyzylsu river valley and 20 km southeast of Danghara in the south of present-day Tajikistan. The site lies at the foot of the Čaltau mountain range. It was the site of a small sanctuary during the Hellenistic period, when the area was part of the Greco-Bactrian kingdom.

== Description ==
Torbulok sits in a natural hollow on the eastern slopes of Mount Čaltau, at around 950 metres above sea level, where the streams from four separate springs meet. It was probably this location that lead to the establishment of a sanctuary on the site. There was a small settlement located downhill from the sanctuary to the east, but, like Takht-i Sangin, the other Hellenistic sanctuary in Tajikistan that has been excavated, Torbulok was located away from major areas of settlement and agriculture in the river valley. The Hellenistic date of the sanctuary is indicated by site finds, including two coins of Diodotus I.

Two terraces have been discovered, one above the other. The sanctuary was surrounded by a plastered mud-brick wall - traces of this have been brought to light at the south end of the upper and lower terraces.

There was a small rectangular mud-brick building (7 m x 9 m) of unknown function in the centre of the upper terrace. This was originally accessed by a ramp on the north side. A courtyard area to the north of the building was paved with pottery sherds.

In the northwestern section of the upper terrace, there was a raised platform with two large basins in the ground, lined with lime mortar, which received water from a spring above the sanctuary. Next to these basins was a khum or "cult shaft". This was a storage amphora placed in the ground upside down, with its mouth sealed and its base cut open, so that worshippers could deposit votive offerings in it. Offerings included pebbles, brought from the Vakhsh (Oxus) river, at least thirty kilometres away, showing that people came to worship at the site from throughout the region.

Later in the site's history, an east-west wall was built to the south of the platform, so that there was a small courtyard between the platform and this wall. Seven miniature altars were installed for food offerings. Various iron and bronze votives, as well as a stone pot, were found in the soil of this layer. The platform and the courtyard were subsequently covered by a landslide, after which the ground was levelled and a kitchen building was erected with a stove, oven, and storage vessels.

To the south of the rectangular building on the upper terrace, there was another kitchen area, where cooking pottery and animal bones were found in large quantities. This building contained a mud-brick bench with a range of votive offerings embedded within it: an amphora, a mill stone, beads, a Bronze Age stone axe and an iron axe - both smashed to pieces. In the same area, there were two rows of rectangular pits two metres apart. Different types of votive material were deposited in different pits, including animal bones, small sherds of pottery, glass beads, and other items which have caused the soil in each of the bits to take on a different colour. Alongside these pits is a burnt clay structure which is perhaps an altar.

The structures on the lower terrace were destroyed by modern construction work before they could be excavated, but a large stone basin called a perirrhanterion, which was used by visitors to Greek sanctuaries to purify themselves before entering the sacred area was found.

The sanctuary was abandoned at the end of the Hellenistic period, though the associated settlement may have survived into the early Kushan period (i.e. the first century BC).

== Research history ==
The first ancient remains from the site came to light during the construction of a schoolhouse in the 1950s. The location was identified as a Kushan site in the 1980s, but re-identified as a Hellenistic site, after locals discovered coins of Diodotus I on the site in 2012. Excavations were carried out by a joint Tajik and German team led by Gunvor Lindström and T. G. Filimonova from 2013 to 2019. These revealed the western part of the site; the central area is believed to have been destroyed during the construction of the schoolhouse. The finds from the site are displayed in a small museum in the school.

== See also ==
- Ai Khanoum

== Bibliography ==
- Lindström, Gunvor (2021). "Southern Tajikistan". In Mairs, Rachel (ed.). The Graeco-Bactrian and Indo-Greek world. Abingdon, Oxfordshire: Routledge. pp. 301–304. ISBN 9781138090699.
