= Orlat plaques =

Archaeological finds

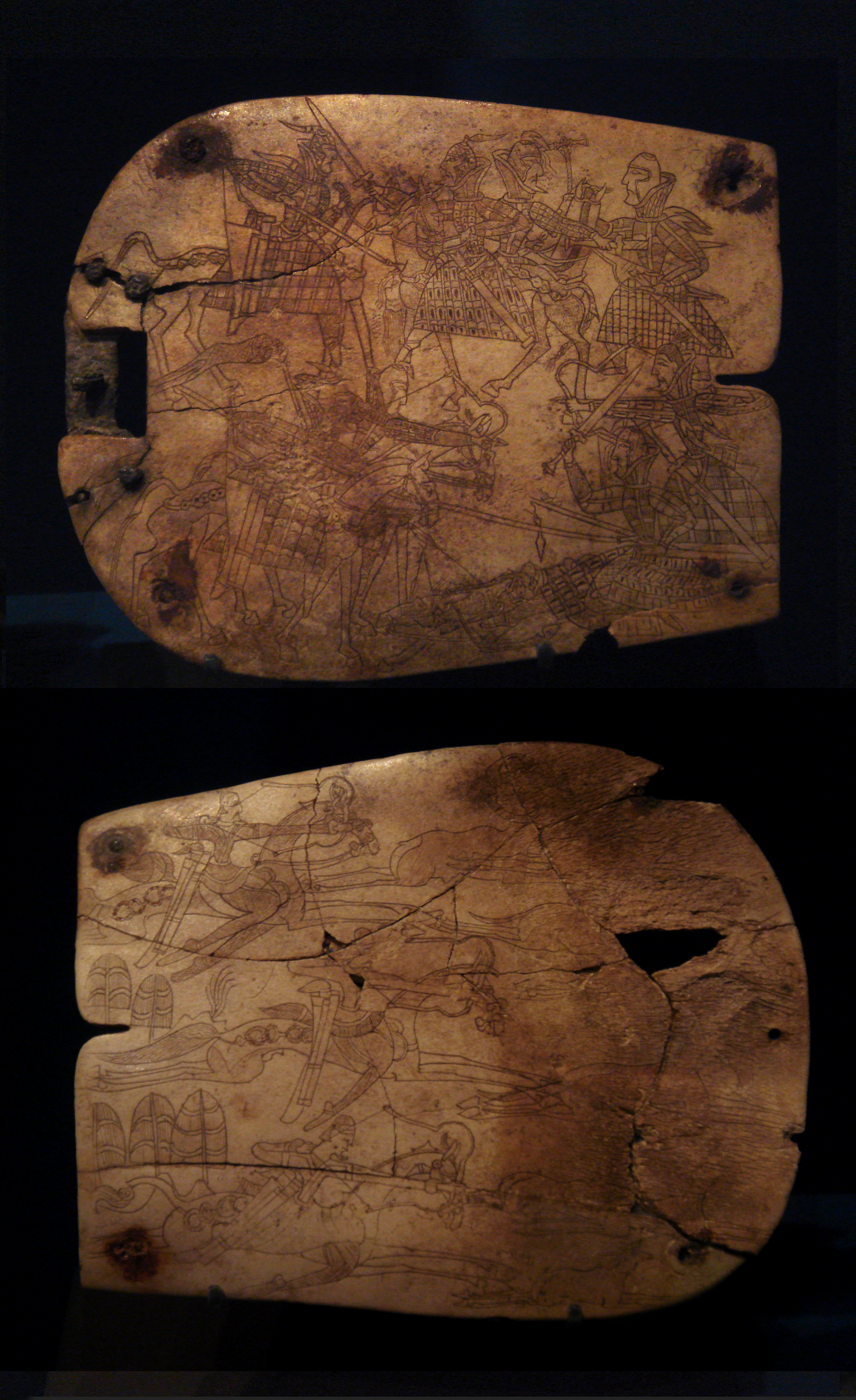
- Orlat plaques
- Material: Bone
- Size: 11 cm × 13.5 cm (4.3 in × 5.3 in)
- Created: 1st–4th century CE
- Place: Nomadic tomb, Orlat cemetery, Kurgan
- Present location: Institute of Art Studies, Academy of Sciences of the Republic of Uzbekistan
- Culture: Saka

Location

The Orlat plaques are a series of bone plaques that were discovered in the mid-1980s in Uzbekistan. They were found during excavations led by Galina Pugachenkova at the cemetery of Orlat, by the bank of the Saganak River (a tributary of the Zeravshan), immediately north of Samarkand. Pugachenkova published her finds in 1989. The left half is decorated with an elaborated battle scene, while on the other side is depicted a hunting scene.

== The plaques ==
The plaques are thought to have been decorative belt buckles. They are decorated with battle scenes between soldiers armed as cataphracts, and one hunting scene. There are three other plaques, smaller in size, on which are depicted a vulture, fighting Bactrian camels, and warriors. The date and attribution of the plaques are disputed, although the consensus tends to suggest a 1st-century CE date.

The plaque with the battle scene depicts a clash with armored warriors. There are soldiers battling on foot, and before them there is a horseman brandishing a sword clashing with another horseman relying on his lance. A warrior has been deprived of his horse down to the right. His lance is broken and he prepares, with his sword, to fight his opponent, a horseman lunging on him with a lance. According to Markus Mode, the composition was originally larger, and it was copied from another source.

One hypothesis is that the plaque depicts a battle between the sedentary Sogdians and the nomadic invaders. In it, the Sogdian hero, leader of his group, repels the attacks of the groups of nomads. For the Sogdians the nomadic incursions were a real threat. According to Mode there is more to it than the record of a battle. The plaque is "a very early manifestation of the narrative imagery that characterizes Sogdian art—one that finds its supreme expression in the painted cycles of 7th- and early 8th-century Panjikent." Thus, the purpose of Sogdian art was to transmit narrative. In their paintings and carvings, "Sogdian artists would include only the essentials. Lines, blocks of color, and a few landscape elements to set the scene create an easy-to-read two-dimensionality that helps advance the progress of the depicted tale." As noted by Mode, this style's origin may be seen in two Orlat plaques.

Yuly Khudyakov found numerous similarities between the plaques and other Xiongnu-Sarmatian finds from Mongolia and Altay, particularly a group of plaques retrieved from Tepsei Mount near the Yenisey River, usually attributed to Tashtyk culture.

Pugachenkova believes the plaques were made by the inhabitants of Kangju, thought to have been closely related to the Kushans and Tocharians. The Kangjus were probably Scythians, opposed to the Kushans, as seen in Khalchayan. Overall, the soldiers would be either Sogdians or Sakas, much less probably Yuezhis or Parthians.

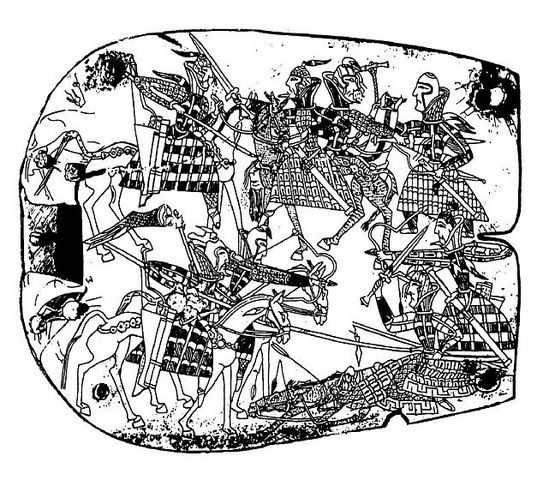
Full drawing of one of the Orlat plaques.

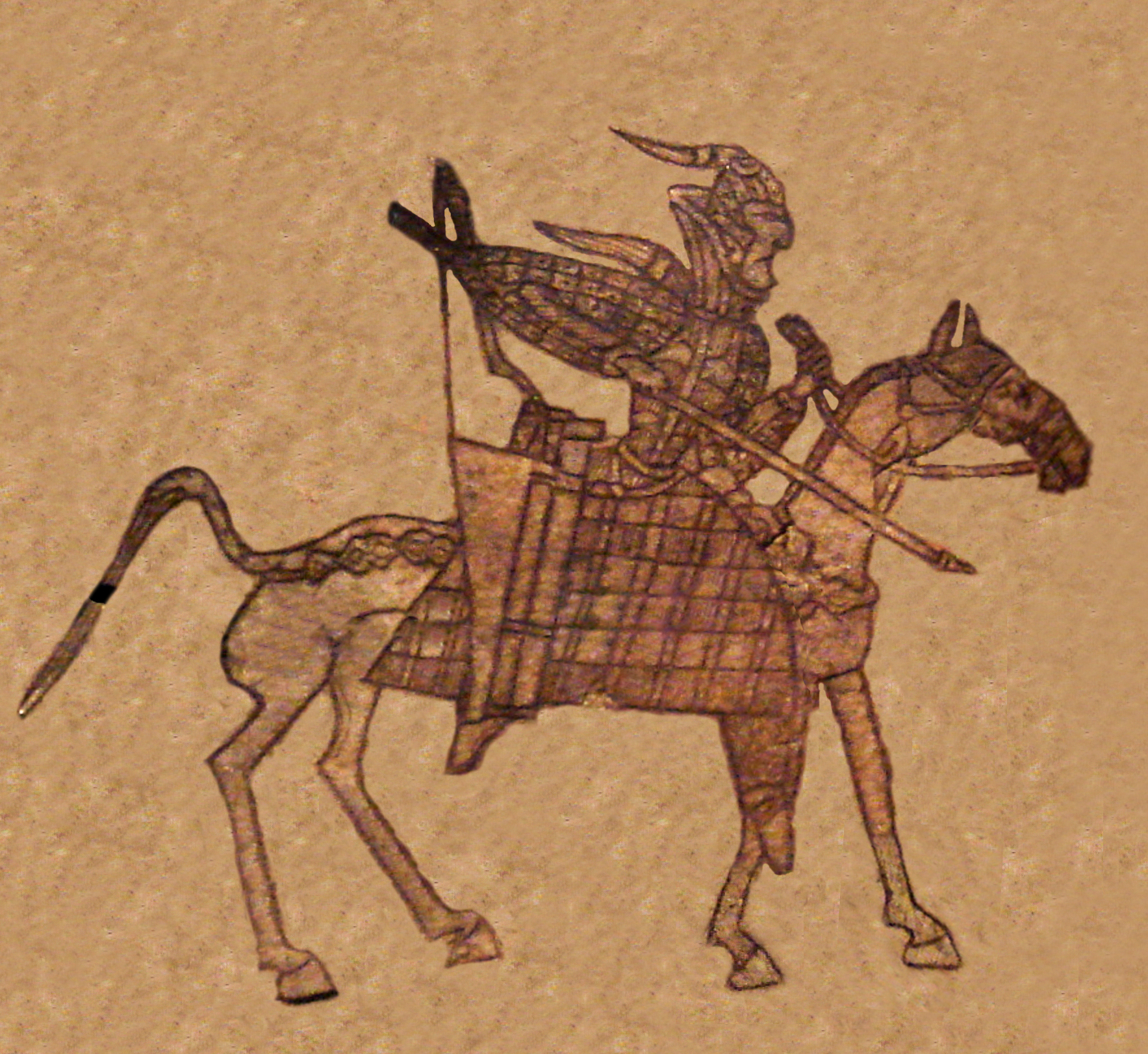
Orlat plaque horserider.

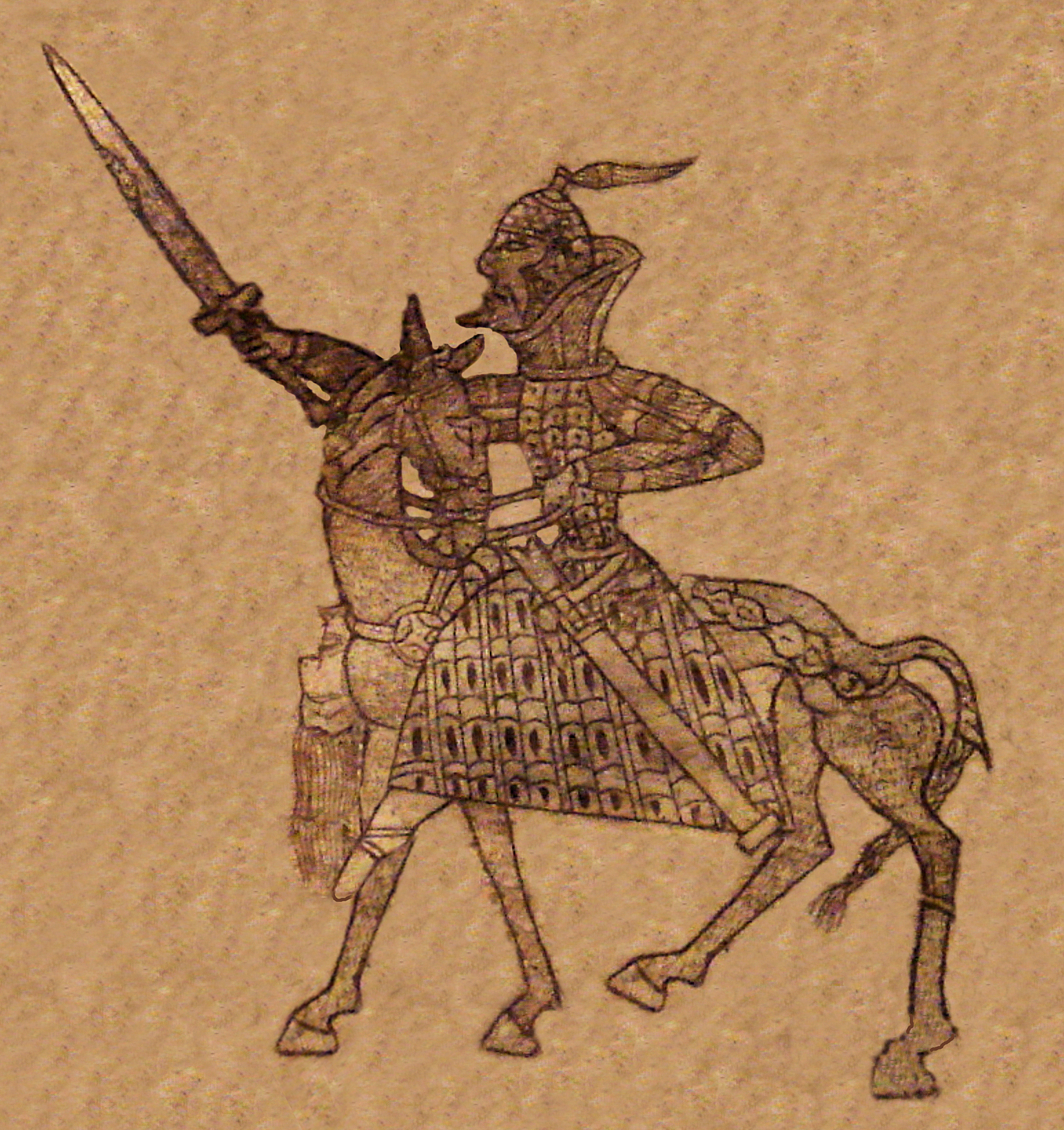
Detail of one of the Orlat plaques. A severed head is probably hanging in front of the horse.

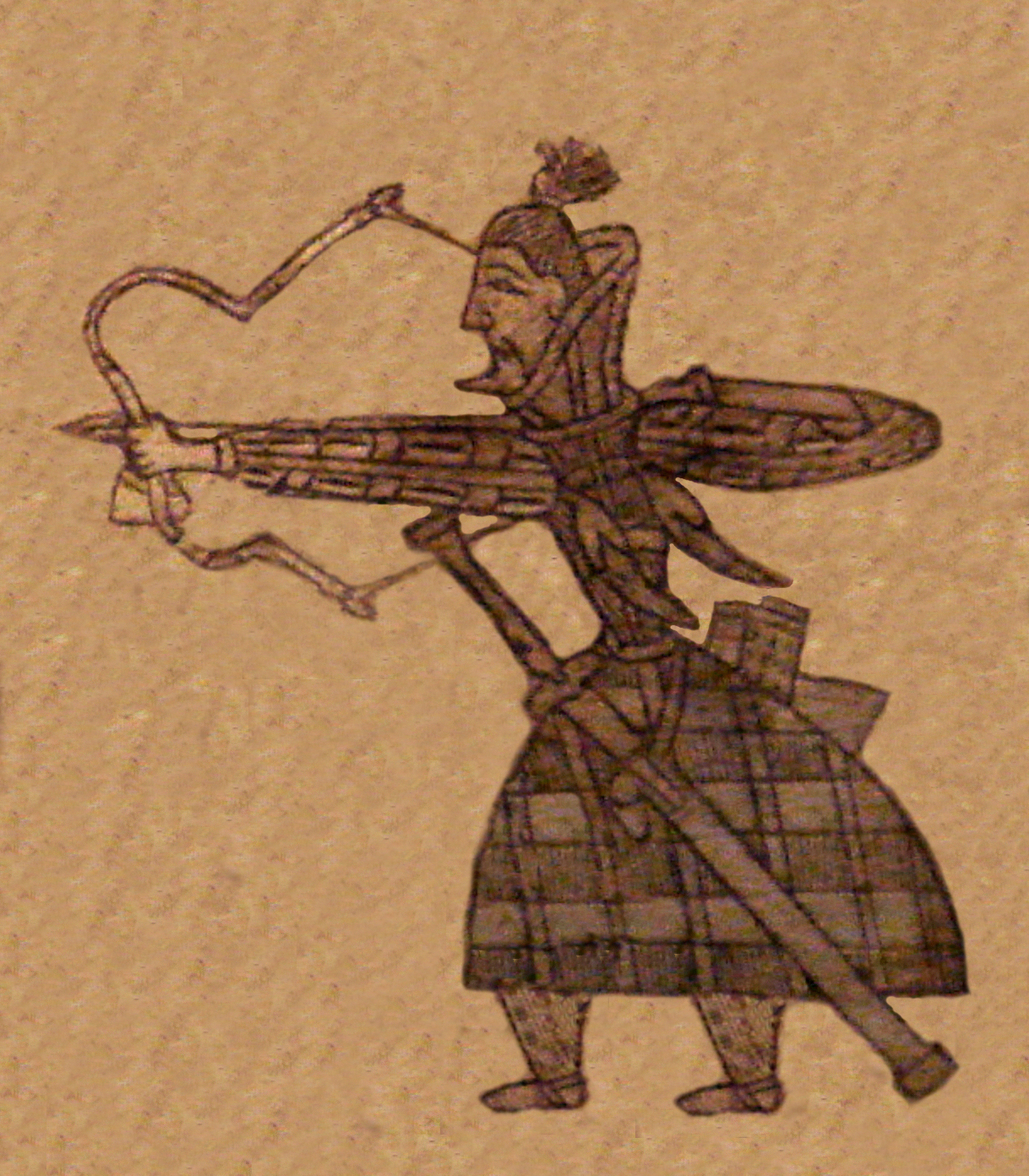
Orlat archer (detail of the plaque).

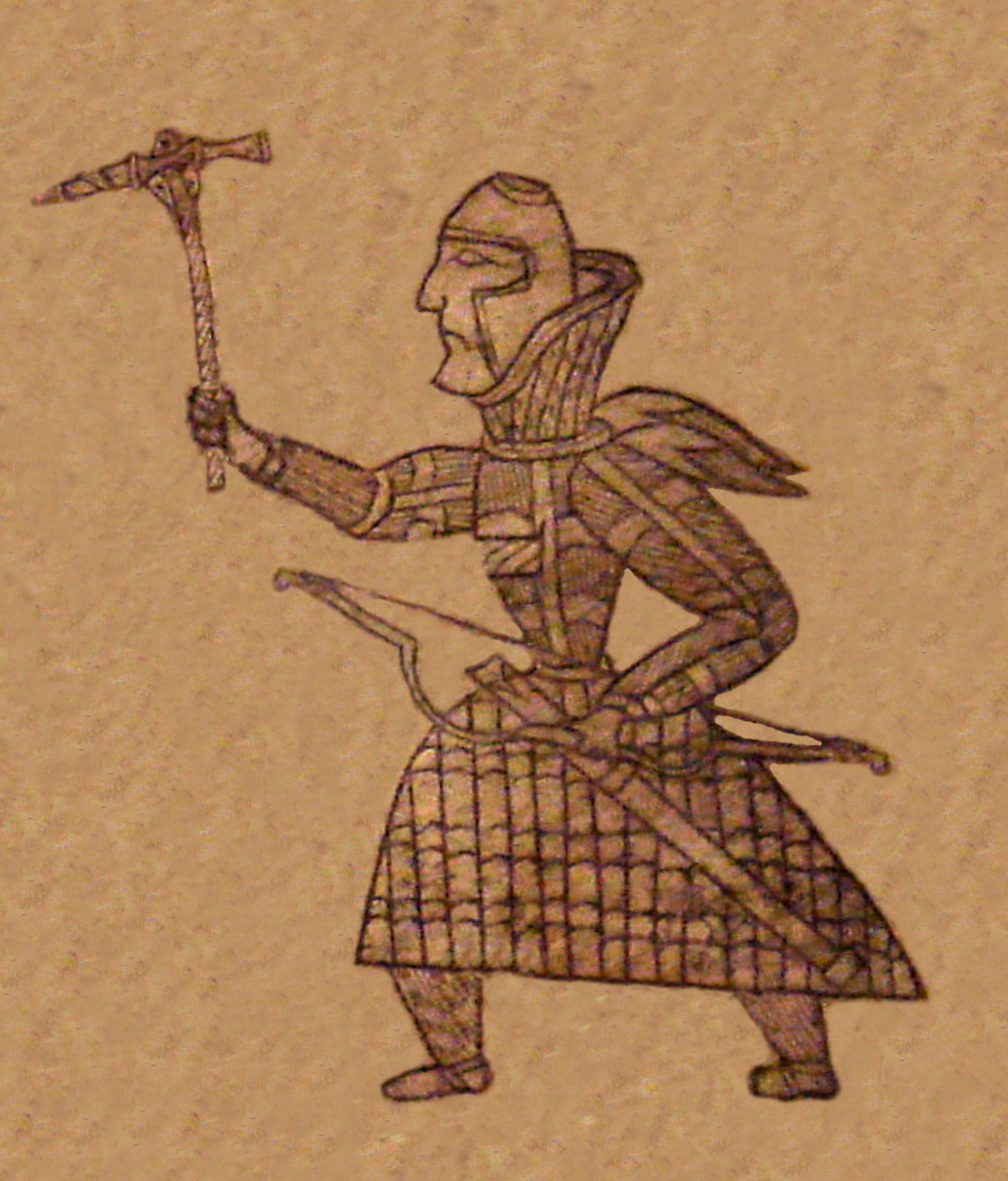
Orlat axeman (detail of the plaque).

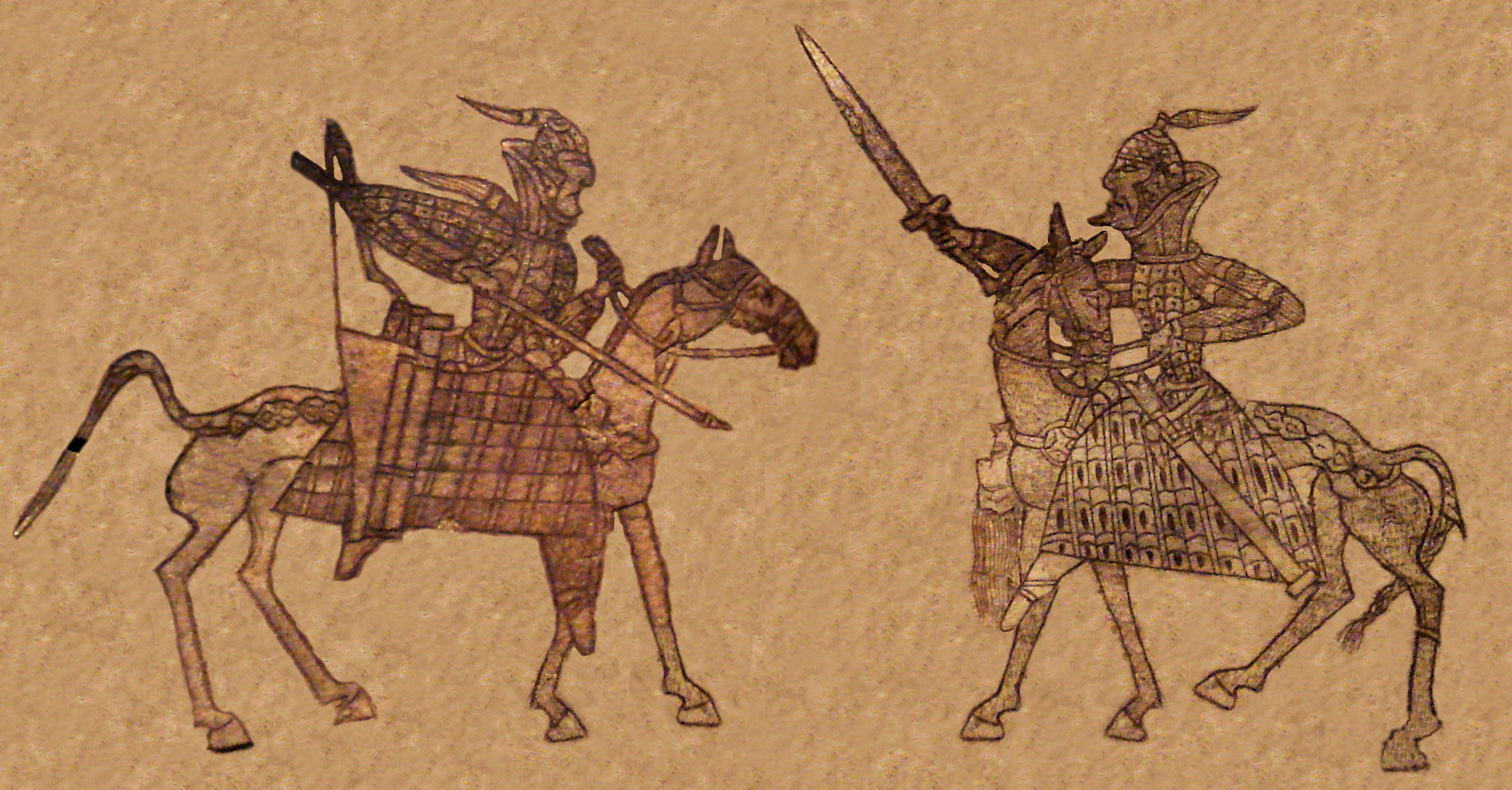
Orlat plaque encounter.

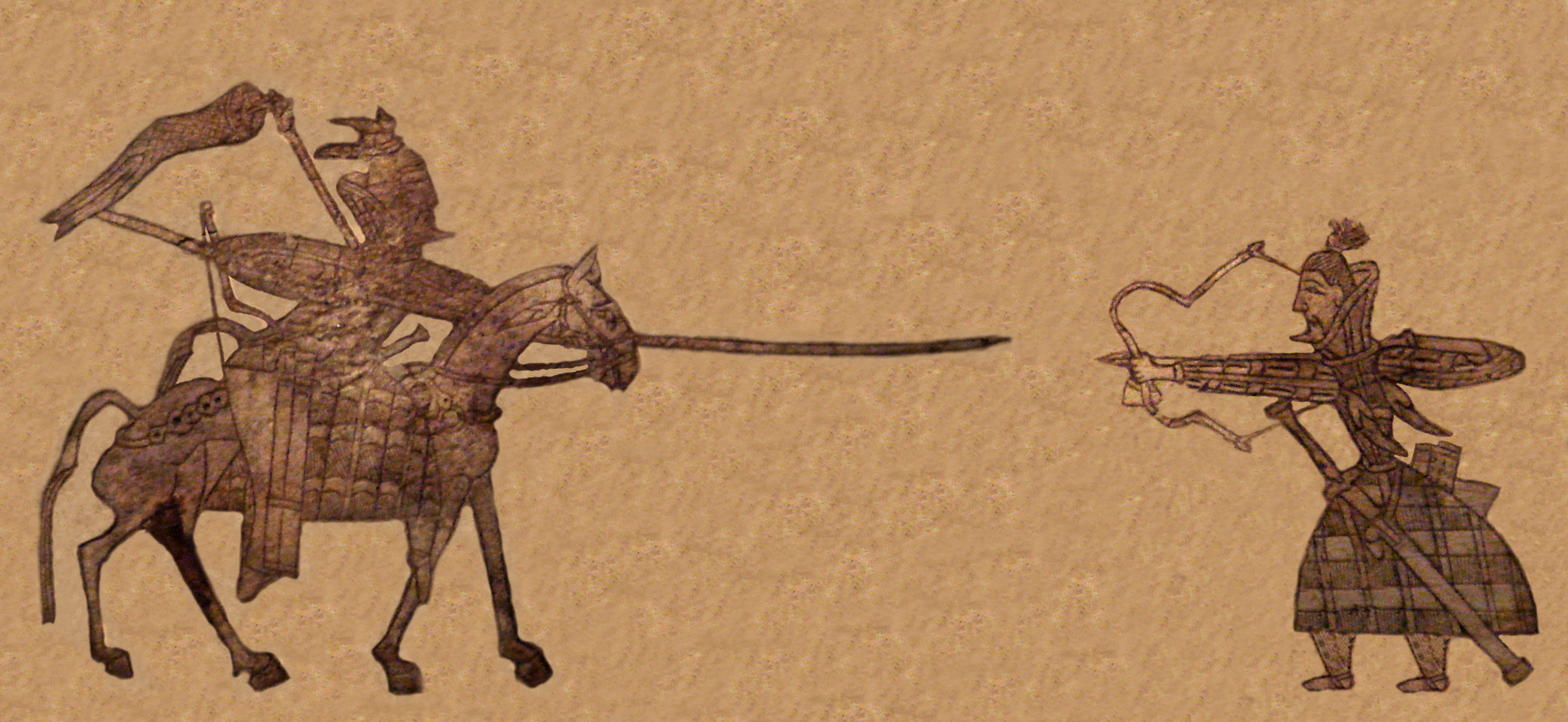
Orlat plaque encounter.

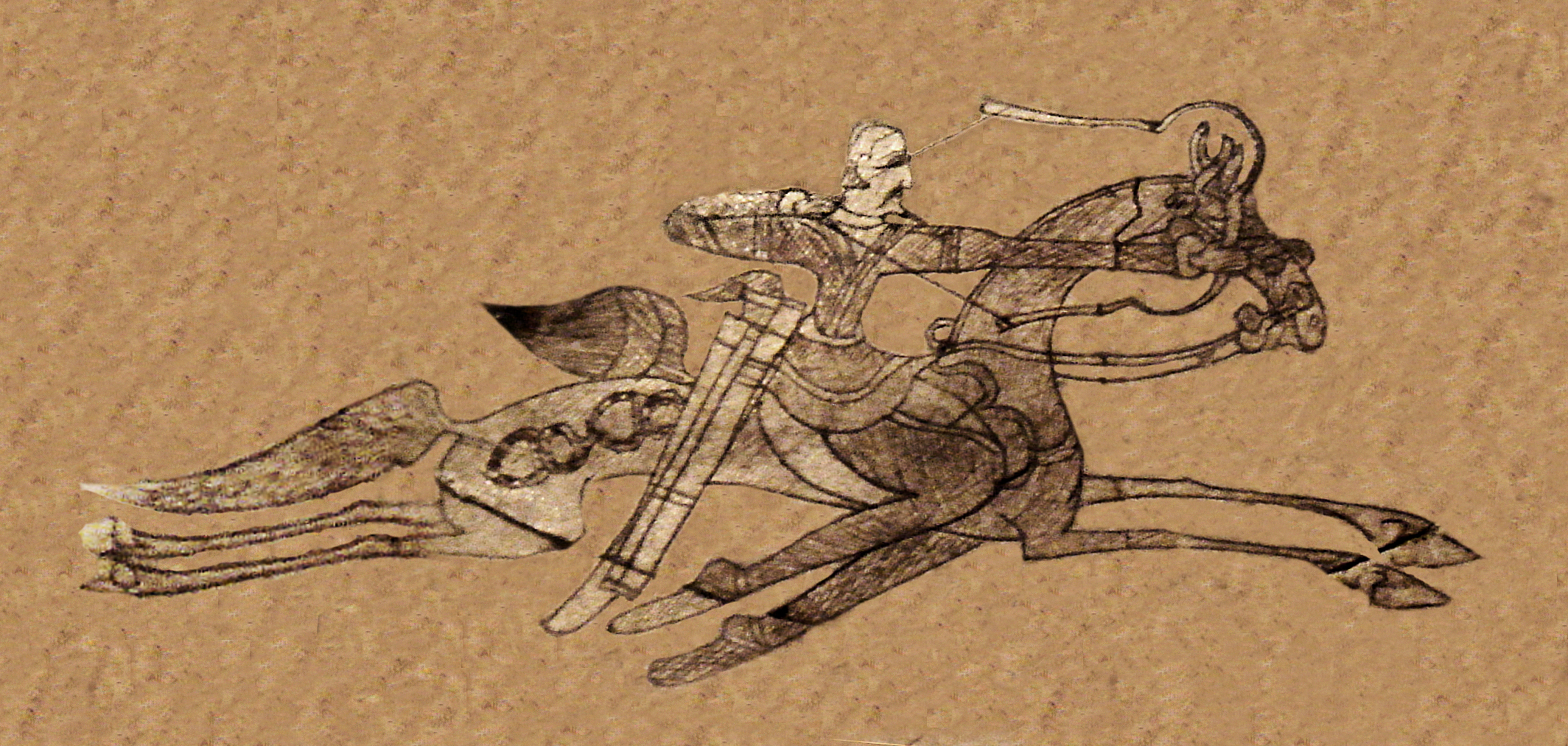
Orlat plaque hunter.

== Parallels ==
The equipment of the warriors in the Orlat plaques is comparable to the equipment of the Indo-Scythians as seen in coins of the Indo-Scythian king Azes II. The figures of the hunters on the reverse are also comparable to the depictions of hunters on an ivory plaque from Takht-i Sangin. These designs are broadly consistent in identifying the Saka or the Saka-Kangju tribes of Central Asia, which were regularly in conflict with the Yuezhis.

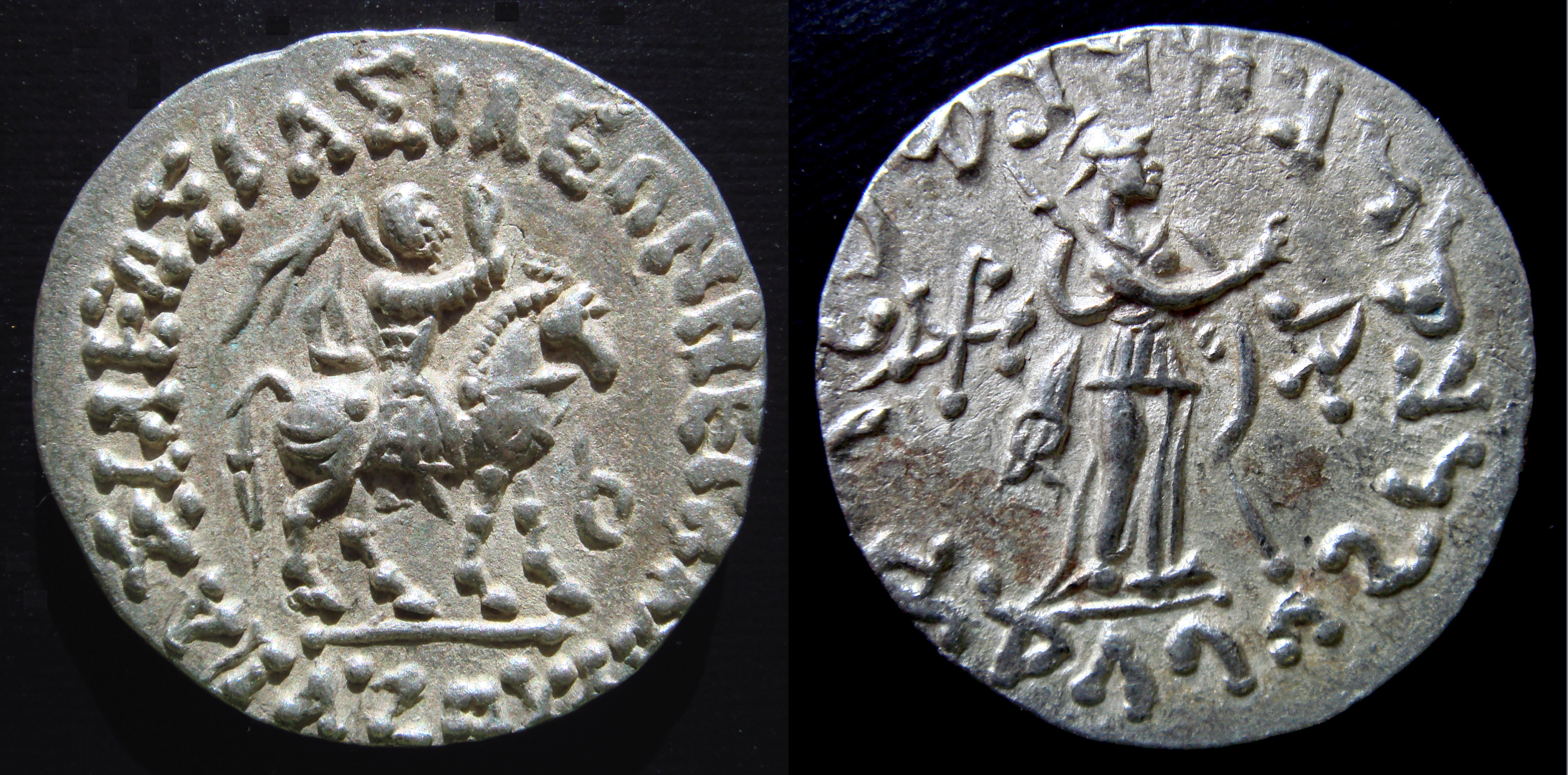
A coin of the Indo-Scythian king Azes II with equipment similar to that of the Orlat plaque.

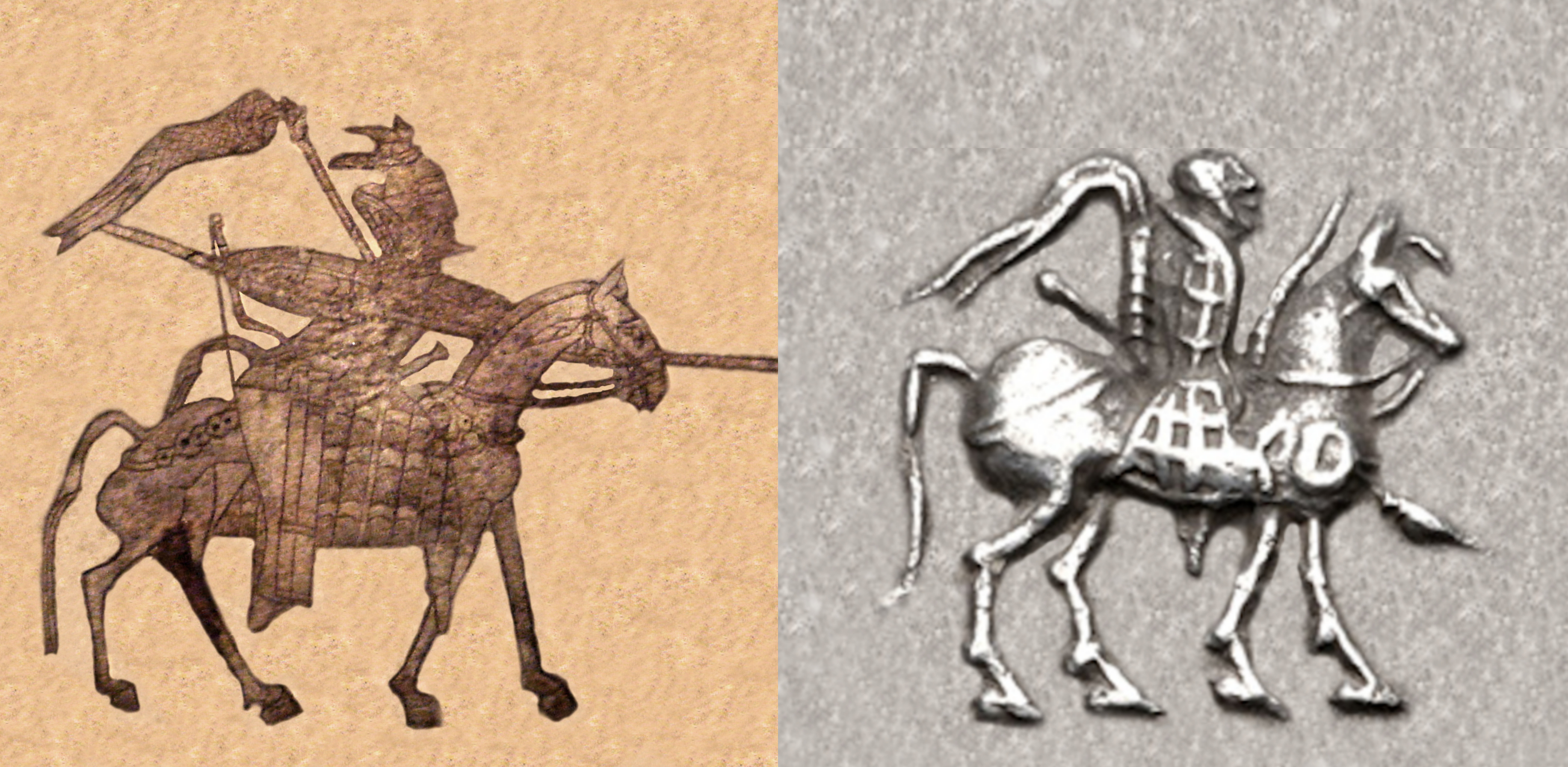
Orlat warrior and warrior on a coin of Azes I.

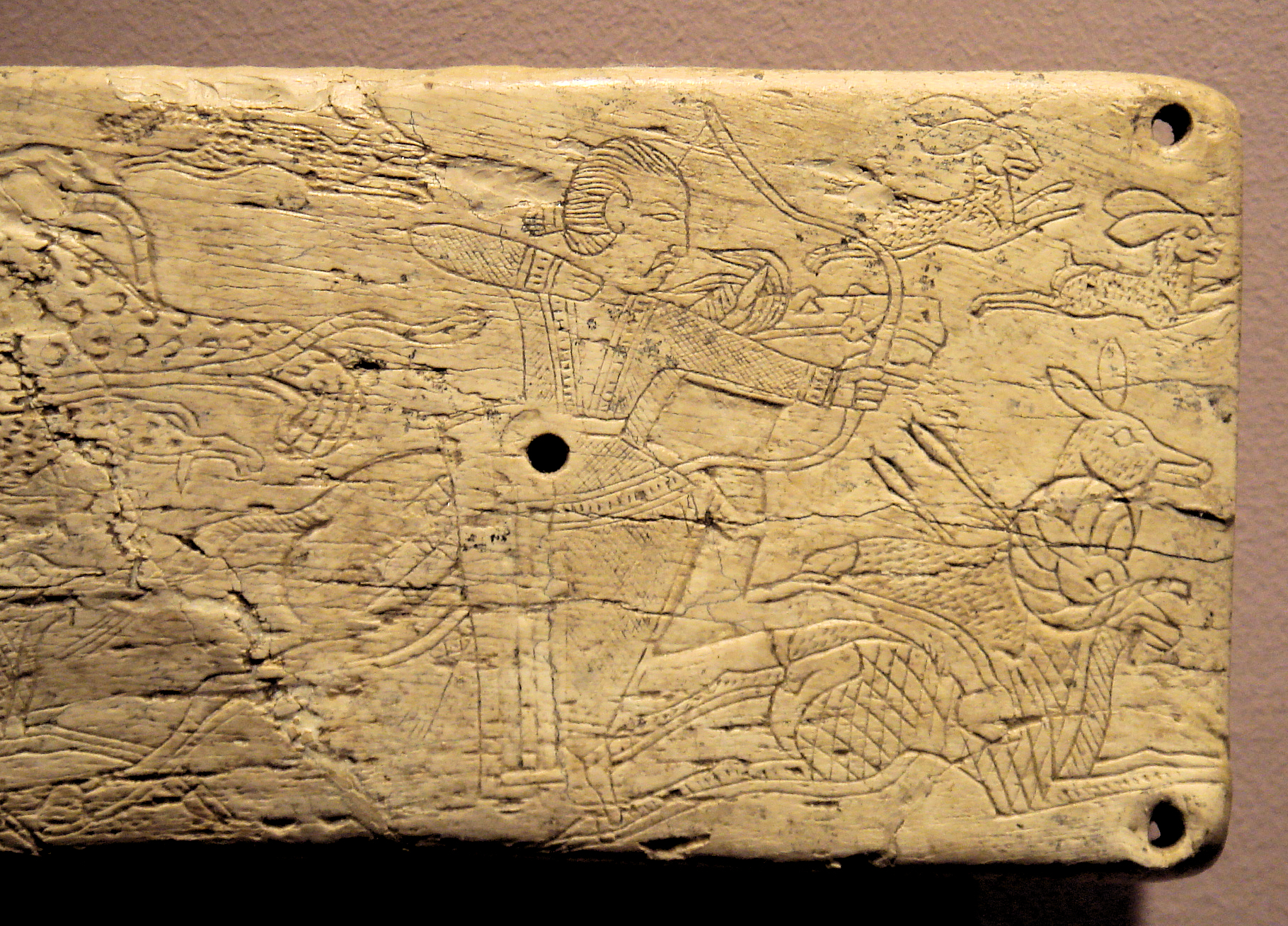
Hunters in an ivory plaque from Takht-i Sangin, with design comparable to the hunting scenes of the Orlat plaques.

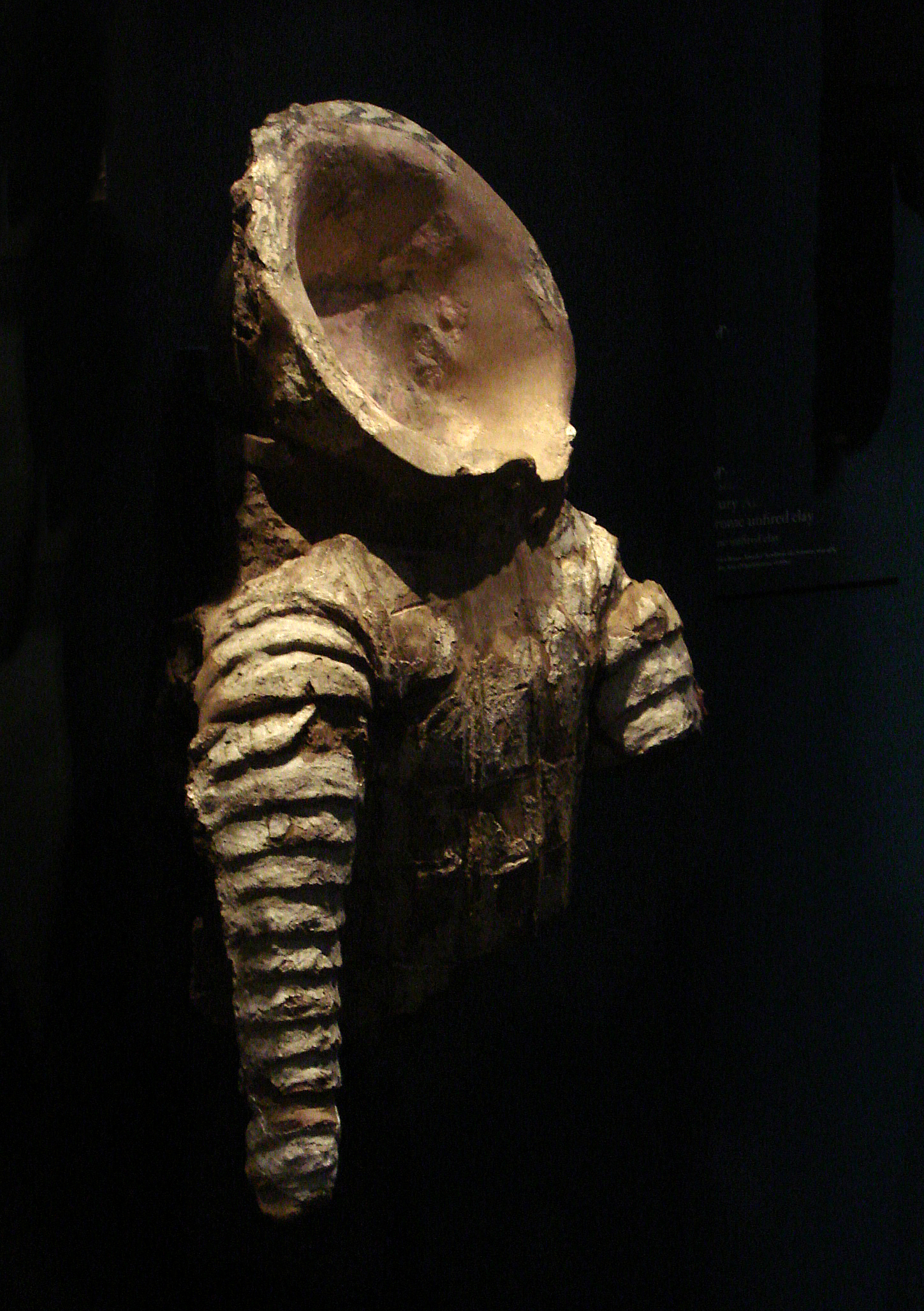
Model of a Saka cataphract armour with neck-guard, from Khalchayan. 1st century BCE. Museum of Arts of Uzbekistan, nb 40.

== Sources ==
- Les Saces, Iaroslav Lebedynsky, Paris: Errance, c2006. ISBN 2-87772-337-2
- Худяков Ю.С. Образ воина в таштыкском изобразительном искусстве // Семантика древних образов. Novosibirsk, 1990. Page 112.
- (in Russian) Detailed description of Orlat finds
- The Orlat Battle Plaque and the Roots of Sogdian Art, Markus Mode, in M. Compareti, P. Raffetta, and G. Scarcia (eds.) Ērān ud Anērān: Studies Presented to Boris Il'ič Maršak on the Occasion of his 70th Birthday, Venice: Libreria editrice Cafoscarina
