= Nicholas Sims-Williams =

British professor (born 1949)

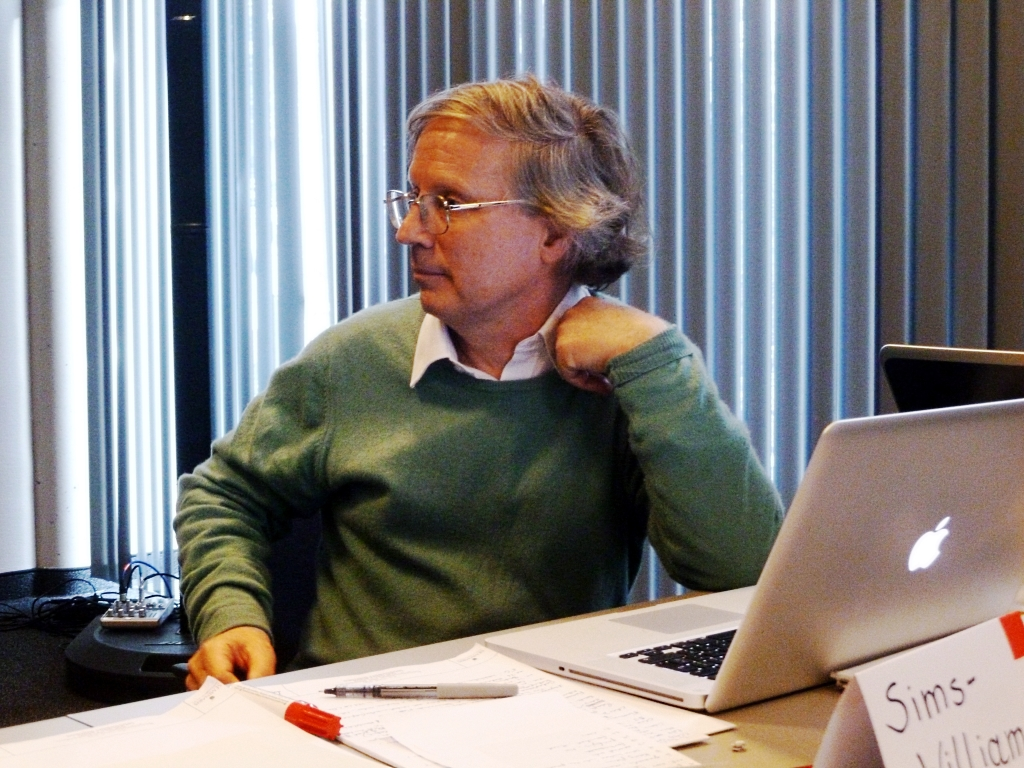
Prof. Nicholas Sims-Williams, Berlin Symposium on the Kushans, Dec. 2013

Nicholas John Sims-Williams, FBA (born 11 April 1949, Chatham, Kent) is a British professor of the School of Oriental and African Studies (SOAS), University of London, where he is the Research Professor of Iranian and Central Asian Studies at the Department of the Languages and Cultures of Near and Middle East. Sims-Williams is a scholar who specializes in Central Asian history, particularly the study of Sogdian and Bactrian languages. He is also a member of the advisory council of the Iranian Studies journal.

Sims-Williams was educated at Trinity Hall, Cambridge, at the same time as his twin brother, the Celtic Studies scholar Patrick Sims-Williams; he graduated with BA, MA (Cantab.) and PhD degrees. Sims-Williams has recently worked on a dedicatory Sogdian inscription, dated to the 1st–3rd centuries CE, that was discovered at Kultobe in Kazakhstan. It alludes to military operations of the principal towns of Sogdiana against the nomads in the north. The inscription tends to confirm the confederational organization of the Kangju state and its various allies that was known previously from the Chinese texts.

== Publications ==
His published works include:

- "Sogdian and other Iranian inscriptions of the Upper Indus II", London (1992)
- "Bactrian ownership inscriptions" BAI 7, pp173–9 (1993)
- "New light on ancient Afghanistan: the decipherment of Bactrian", London (1997)
- "Bactrian documents from Northern Afghanistan I: Legal and economic documents" Oxford ISBN 0-19-727502-8 (2000)
- "Recent discoveries in the Bactrian language and their historical significance", Society for the Preservation of Afghanistan's Cultural Heritage (Afghanistan). (2004)
- "Some Bactrian seal-inscriptions" in "Afghanistan, ancien carrefour entre l'est et l'ouest" BREPOLS ISBN 2-503-51681-5
- Nicholas Sims-Williams and Franz Grenet, The Sogdian Inscriptions of Kultobe, Shygys (Almaty), 2006, pp. 95–111.
- Nicholas Sims-Williams, Franz Grenet, and Alexandr N. Podushkin, Les plus anciens monuments de la langue sogdienne: les inscriptions de Kultobe au Kazakhstan, Compte-rendus de l’Académie des Inscriptions et Belles-Lettres, 2007 [2009] pp. 1005, 1025–1033.
- Nicholas Sims-Williams (ed.), Biblical and other Christian Sogdian texts from the Turfan Collection, Turnhout: Brepols, 2014.
- "A new Bactrian Inscription from the time of Kanishka." In: Kushan Histories: Literary Sources and Selected Papers from a Symposium at Berlin, December 5 to 7, 2013. Edited by Harry Falk. Hempen Verlag, Bremen (2015), pp. 255–264.
