= Henri-Paul Francfort =

French archaeologist

Henri-Paul Francfort is a French archaeologist and member ("directeur de recherche") of the CNRS. He is noted for his excavations at Shortugai.

== Publications ==
- Fouilles de Shortugaï, Recherches sur L'Asie Centrale Protohistorique Paris: Diffusion de Boccard, 1989
- Nomades et sédentaires en Asie centrale Sous la direction d' Henri-Paul Francfort Éditions du CNRS, Paris, 1970
- Répertoires des pétroglyphes d'Asie Centrale Sous la direction de Henri-Paul Francfort, Jakov A. Sher De Boccard, Paris, 1999
- Fussman, G.; Kellens, J.; Francfort, H.-P.; Tremblay, X.: Aryas, Aryens et Iraniens en Asie Centrale. (2005) Institut Civilisation Indienne ISBN 2-86803-072-6
